= Cro-Magnon =

Earliest anatomically modern humans in Europe and West Asia

European early modern humans
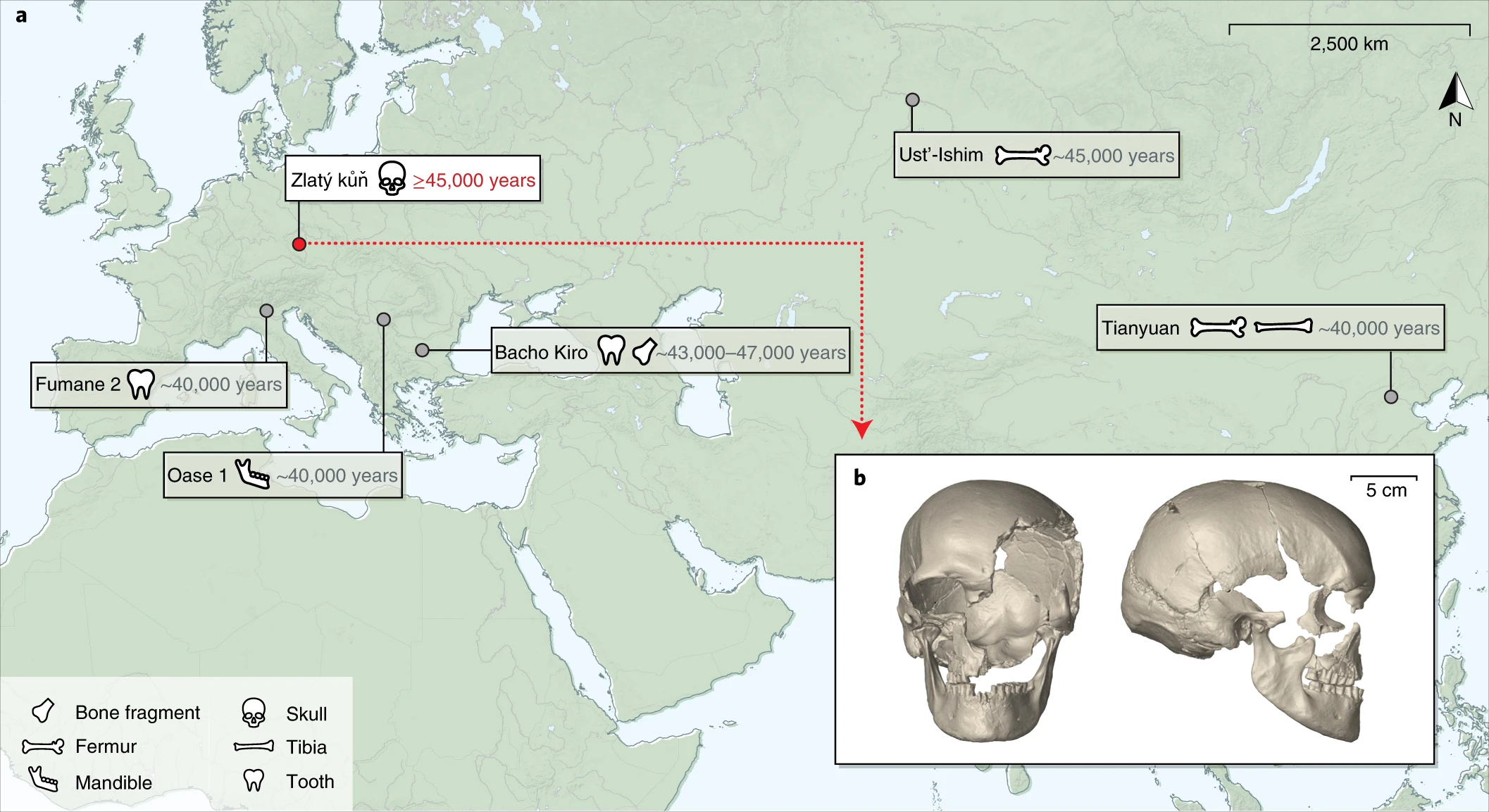
- Major sites around Europe
- Alternative names: Cro-Magnon
- Horizon: Europe, following recent African origin of modern humans
- Period: From Upper Paleolithic to Mesolithic
- Dates: c. 54,800-20,000 BCE
- Type site: Cro-Magnon rock shelter, France
- Major sites: Kostenki-14, Russia; Peștera cu Oase, Romania
- Characteristics: European hunter-gatherers attributed behavioral modernity Y-DNA haplogroups: C1, IJ, K2a
- Preceded by: Basal Eurasian; Admixture with indigenous Neanderthals
- Followed by: Aurignacian, Magdalenian, Gravettian, Epi-Gravettian
- Defined by: Louis Lartet

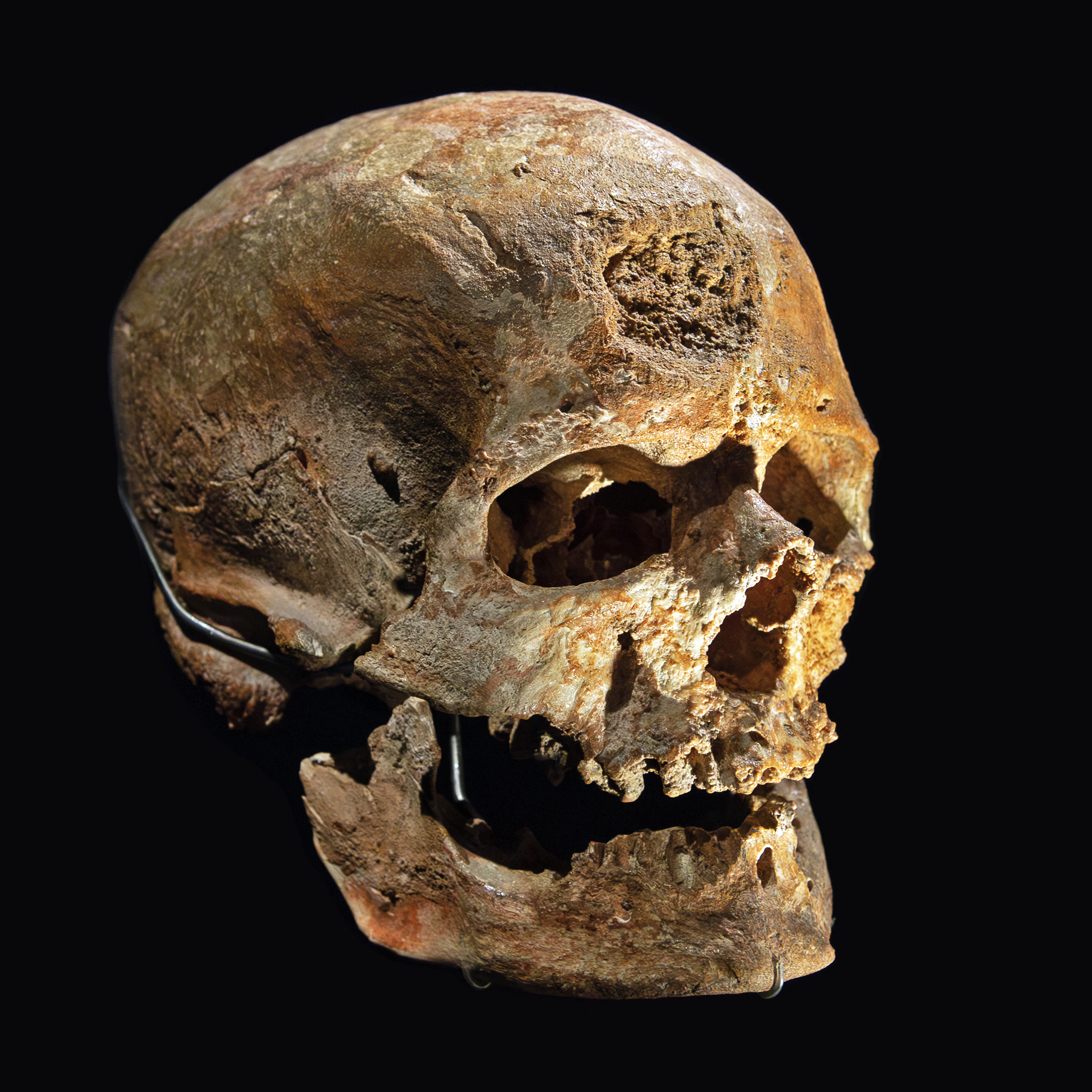
Skull of Cro-Magnon 1

Cro-Magnons (Note: /kroʊˈmænjɒn/ kroh-MAN-yon or /kroʊˈmæɡnən/ kroh-MAG-nən, French: [kʁomaɲɔ̃].) or European early modern humans (EEMH) were the first surviving expansion of early modern humans (Homo sapiens) found in Europe and Siberia, continuously occupying the continent possibly from as early as 56,800 years ago. They interacted and interbred with the indigenous Neanderthals (H. neanderthalensis) of Europe and Western Asia, who went extinct 35,000 to 40,000 years ago. At the time of this admixture, those Neanderthals already possessed about 6% Homo sapiens ancestry, from admixture with an earlier, extinct sapiens population in Eurasia earlier than 240kya. Ancient DNA research indicates that the earliest modern humans in Europe during the Initial Upper Paleolithic (~45–40 kya) were part of the broader early expansion of Homo sapiens from Eurasia.

Genetic data show that some early European individuals, such as those associated with the Lincombian-Ranisian-Jerzmanowician technocomplex, represent lineages that left little or no detectable ancestry in later European populations. However, other lineages present in Europe by ~38–37 kya are genetically closer to later Upper Paleolithic Europeans. These surviving Upper Paleolithic populations contributed ancestry to Mesolithic European hunter-gatherers, including Western Hunter-Gatherers (WHG), who in turn form one of the principal ancestral components of present-day Europeans. Rather than reflecting a separate later migration into Europe prior to the Neolithic, current evidence supports a model of early population structure followed by lineage extinction and survival within the initial Homo sapiens expansion from the continent. Cro-Magnons produced Upper Palaeolithic cultures, the first major one being the Aurignacian, which was succeeded by the Gravettian by 30,000 years ago. The Gravettian split into the Epi-Gravettian in the east and Solutrean in the west, due to major climatic degradation during the Last Glacial Maximum (LGM), peaking 21,000 years ago. As Europe warmed, the Solutrean evolved into the Magdalenian by 20,000 years ago, and these peoples recolonised Europe. The Magdalenian and Epi-Gravettian gave way to Mesolithic cultures as big game animals were dying out, and the Last Glacial Period drew to a close. Upper Paleolithic West Eurasian populations contributed ancestry to later European hunter-gatherers and share deep genetic affinities with ancient Near Eastern populations, some of whose descendants later contributed to populations in West Asia and North Africa.

Cro-Magnons were generally more robust than most living populations, having larger brains, broader faces, more prominent brow ridges, and bigger teeth. The earliest Cro-Magnon specimens also exhibit some features that are reminiscent of those found in Neanderthals. The first Cro-Magnons would have generally had darker skin tones than most modern Europeans and some West Asians and North Africans; natural selection for lighter skin would not have begun until 30,000 years ago. Before the LGM, Cro-Magnons had overall low population density, tall stature similar to post-industrial humans, and expansive trade routes stretching as long as 900 km (560 mi), and hunted big game animals. Cro-Magnons had much higher populations than the Neanderthals, possibly due to higher fertility rates; life expectancy for both species was typically under 40 years. Following the LGM, population density increased as communities travelled less frequently (though for longer distances), and the need to feed so many more people in tandem with the increasing scarcity of big game caused them to rely more heavily on small or aquatic game (broad spectrum revolution), and to more frequently participate in game drive systems and slaughter whole herds at a time. The Cro-Magnon arsenal included spears, spear-throwers, harpoons, and possibly throwing sticks and Palaeolithic dogs. Cro-Magnons likely commonly constructed temporary huts while moving around, and Gravettian peoples notably made large huts on the East European Plain out of mammoth bones.

Cro-Magnons are well renowned for creating a diverse array of artistic works, including cave paintings, Venus figurines, perforated batons, animal figurines, and geometric patterns. They also wore decorative beads and plant-fibre clothes dyed with various plant-based dyes. For music, they produced bone flutes and whistles, and possibly also bullroarers, rasps, drums, idiophones, and other instruments. They buried their dead, though possibly only people who had achieved or were born into high status.

The name "Cro-Magnon" comes from the five skeletons discovered by French palaeontologist Louis Lartet in 1868 at the Cro-Magnon rock shelter, Les Eyzies, Dordogne, France, after the area was accidentally discovered while a road was constructed for a railway station. Remains of Palaeolithic cultures have been known for centuries, but they were initially interpreted in a creationist model, wherein they represented antediluvian peoples which were wiped out by the Great Flood. Following the conception and popularisation of evolution in the mid-to-late 19th century, Cro-Magnons became the subject of much scientific racism, with early race theories allying with Nordicism and Pan-Germanism. Such historical race concepts were overturned by the mid-20th century.

== Chronology ==
=== Initial Upper Palaeolithic ===
When early modern humans (Homo sapiens) migrated onto the European continent, they interacted with the indigenous Neandertals (Homo neanderthalensis) that had already inhabited Europe for hundreds of thousands of years. In 2019, Greek palaeoanthropologist Katerina Harvati and colleagues argued that two 210,000-year-old skulls from Apidima Cave, Greece, represent modern humans rather than Neanderthals, indicating these populations have an unexpectedly deep history—but this was disputed in 2020 by French paleoanthropologist Marie-Antoinette de Lumley and colleagues. In marine isotope stage 3, beginning about 60,000 years ago, there were rapid fluctuations between forestland and open steppeland.

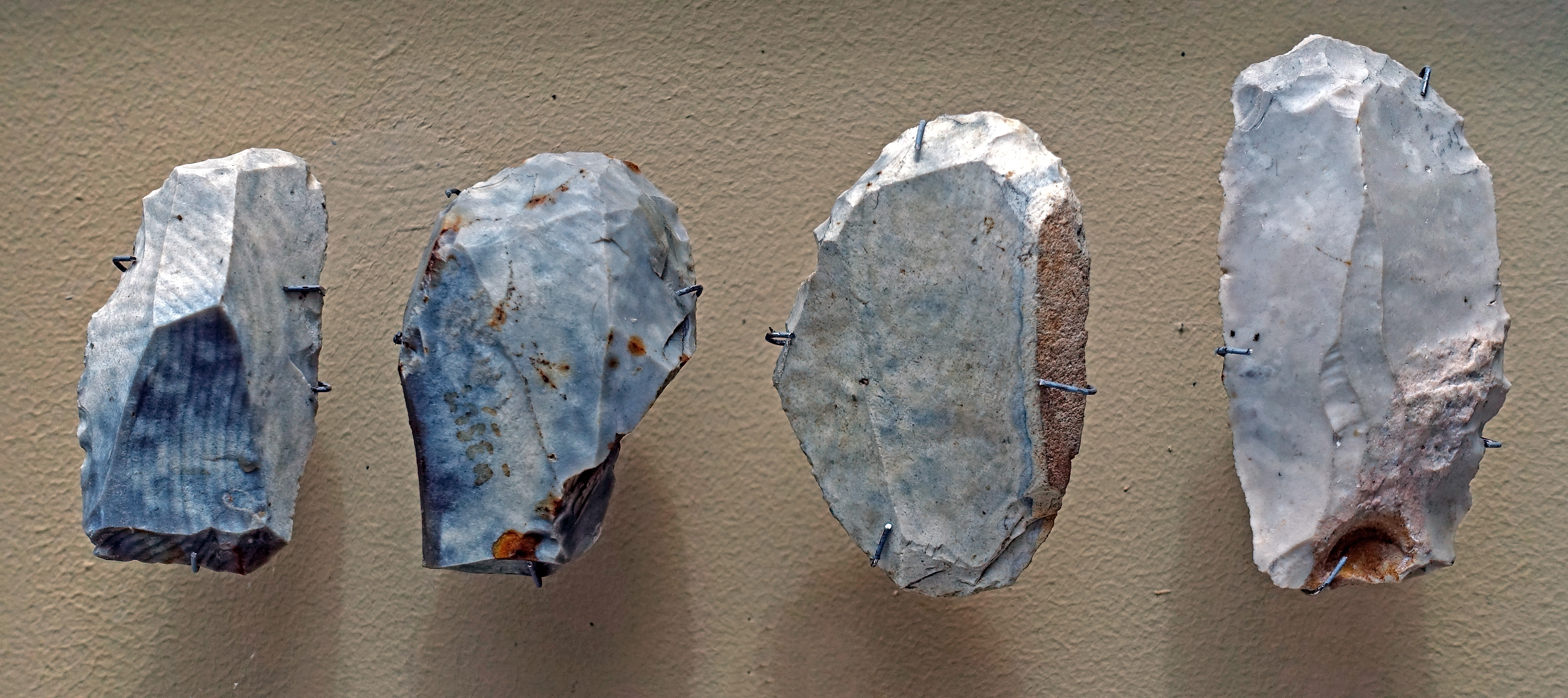
Bohunician scrapers in the Moravian Museum, Czech Republic

The earliest indication of Upper Palaeolithic modern human migration into Europe is a series of modern human teeth with Neronian industry stone tools found at Mandrin Cave, Malataverne in France, dated in 2022 to between 56,800 and 51,700 years ago. The Neronian is one of the many industries associated with modern humans classed as transitional between the Middle and Upper Palaeolithic. Beyond this there is the Balkan Bohunician industry beginning 48,000 years ago, likely deriving from the Levantine Emiran industry, the remains found in the cave Ilsenhöhle in Ranis, Germany, up to 47,500 years old, associated with the Lincombian-Ranisian-Jerzmanowician (LRJ) technocomplex, and the next-oldest fossils date to roughly 44,000 years ago in Bulgaria, Italy, and Britain (Kents Cavern 4). It is unclear, while migrating westward, if they followed the Danubian corridor or went along the Mediterranean coast.

Analysis of the LRJ associated individuals from Ranis, as well as the contemporaneous Zlatý kůň woman, suggests that they represent a basal lineage of the Out of Africa population that diverged prior to the split between West and East Eurasians, and not ancestral to modern non-Africans. Other Initial Upper Paleolithic specimens such as those found at Bacho Kiro cave, Bulgaria and the Peștera cu Oase, Romania were either early offshoots of the Ancient East Eurasian lineage, or a group who diverged very close to the West Eurasian-East Eurasian split.

It has been proposed that the earliest inhabitants of Europe expanded from a population hub on the Persian plateau 48,000 to 46,000 years ago, correlating with the dispersal of IUP-affiliated material culture. In Europe, the IUP-affiliated groups got largely absorbed by later expanding "West Eurasian" populations (>38,000 years ago) with UP-affiliated material culture, resulting in the formation of the Aurignacian material culture.

Beginning about 38,000 years ago, the Proto-Aurignacian culture, the first widely recognised European Upper Palaeolithic culture, spread out across Europe, probably descending from the Near Eastern Ahmarian.

=== Aurignacian ===
Map of the distribution of the main Aurignacian sites before the Last Glacial Maximum (LGM)

The Aurignacian industry took hold perhaps in south-central Europe sometime after 40,000 years ago, with the onset of Heinrich event 4 (a period of extreme seasonality) and the Campanian Ignimbrite eruption near Naples (which covered eastern Europe in ash). The Aurignacian culture rapidly replaced others across the continent. This wave of modern humans replaced Neanderthals and their Mousterian culture, as well as IUP-affiliated cultures such as the Châtelperronian culture. In the Danube Valley, Aurignacian sites are few and far between, compared to later traditions, until 35,000 years ago. From here, the "Typical Aurignacian" becomes quite prevalent, and extends until 29,000 years ago.

=== Gravettian ===
Gradually replaced by the Gravettian culture, the close of the Aurignacian is poorly defined. "Aurignacoid" or "Epi-Aurignacian" tools are identified as late as 15,000 to 18,000 years ago. It is also unclear where the Gravettian originated from as it diverges strongly from the Aurignacian (and therefore may not have descended from it). Nonetheless, genetic evidence indicates that not all Aurignacian bloodlines went extinct.

Hypotheses for Gravettian genesis include evolution: in central Europe from the Szeletian (which developed from the Bohunician) which existed 37,000 to 41,000 ago; or from the Ahmarian or similar cultures from the Near East or the Caucasus that existed before 40,000 years ago. It is further debated where the earliest occurrence is identified, with the former hypothesis arguing for Germany about 37,500 years ago, and the latter Buran-Kaya III rockshelter in Crimea about 36,000 to 38,000 years ago. In either case, the appearance of the Gravettian coincides with a significant temperature drop. Also around 37,000 years ago, the founder population of all later early modern humans existed, and Europe would remain in genetic isolation from the rest of the world for the next 23,000 years.

=== Last Glacial Maximum ===
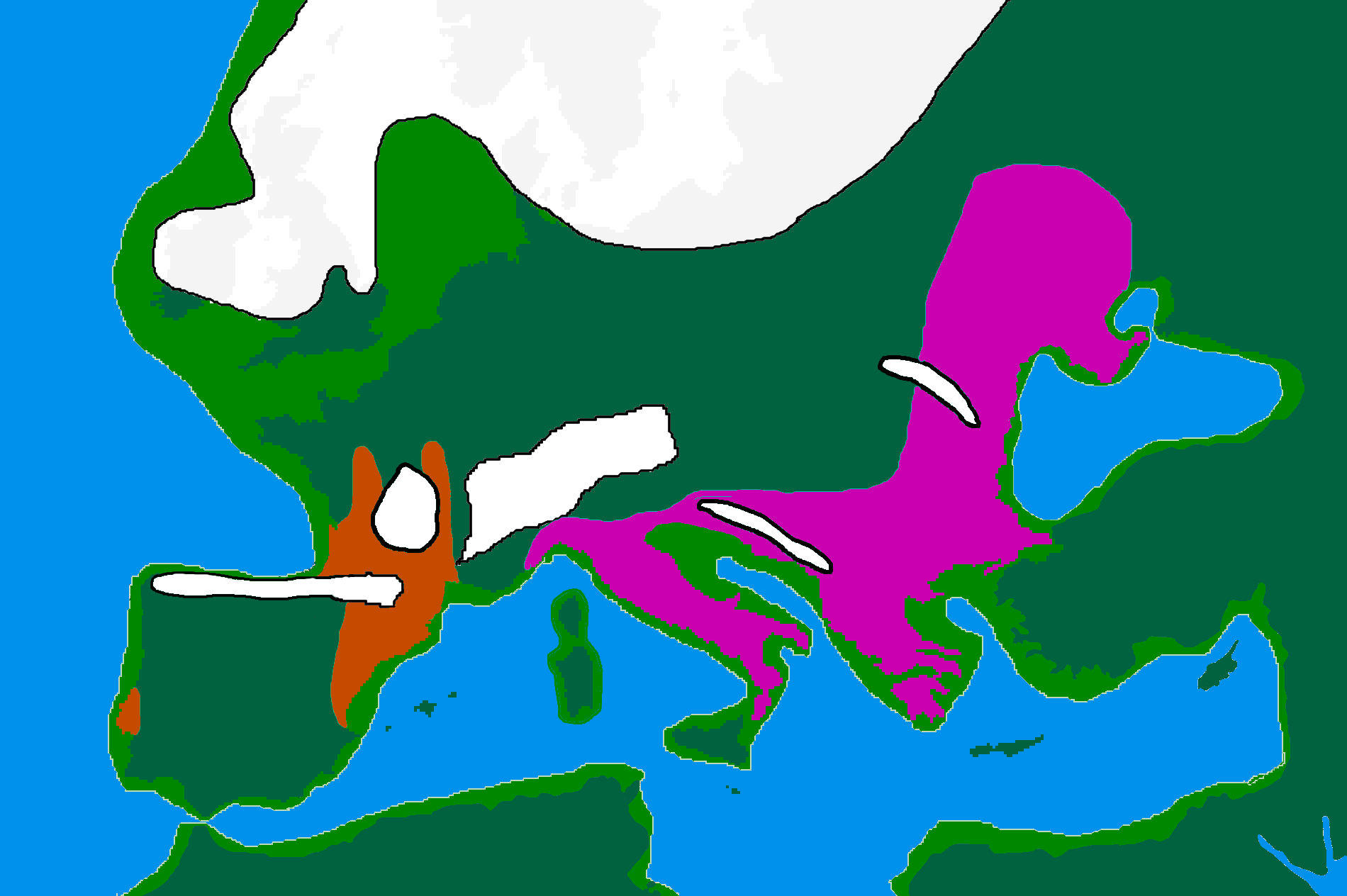
LGM refugia, c. 20,000 years ago Solutrean Epigravettian

Around 29,000 years ago, marine isotope stage 2 began and cooling intensified. This peaked about 21,000 years ago during the Last Glacial Maximum (LGM) when Scandinavia, the Baltic region, and the British Isles were covered in glaciers, and winter sea ice reached the French seaboard. The Alps were also covered in glaciers, and most of Europe was polar desert, with mammoth steppe and forest steppe dominating the Mediterranean coast.

Consequently, large swathes of Europe were uninhabitable, and two distinct cultures emerged with unique technologies to adapt to the new environment: the Solutrean in southwestern Europe, which invented brand new technologies, and the Epigravettian from Italy to the East European Plain, which adapted the previous Gravettian technologies. Solutrean peoples inhabited the permafrost zone, whereas Epigravettian peoples appear to have stuck to less harsh, seasonally frozen areas. Relatively few sites are known through this time.

The glaciers began retreating about 20,000 years ago, and the Solutrean evolved into the Magdalenian, which would recolonise Western and Central Europe over the next couple thousand years. Starting during the Older Dryas roughly 14,000 years ago, Final Magdalenian traditions appear, namely the Azilian, Hamburgian, and Creswellian. During the Bølling–Allerød warming, Near Eastern genes began showing up in the indigenous Europeans, indicating the end of Europe's genetic isolation. Possibly due to the continual reduction of European big game, the Magdalenian and Epigravettian were completely replaced by the Mesolithic by the beginning of the Holocene.

=== Mesolithic ===
Europe was repeopled entirely during the Holocene climatic optimum from 5-9000 years ago. Mesolithic Western hunter-gatherers (WHG) contributed significantly to the current European genome, alongside Ancient North Eurasians (ANE), who descended from the Siberian Mal'ta–Buret' culture and Caucasus hunter-gatherers (CHG). Most present-day Europeans have a 40–60% WHG ratio, and the 8000-year-old Loschbour man seems to have had a similar genetic makeup. Near Eastern Neolithic farmers, who split from western hunter-gatherers about 40,000 years ago, started to spread out across Europe by 8000 years ago, ushering in Neolithic Europe with Early European Farmers (EEF). EEF contribute about 30% of ancestry to present-day Baltic populations, and up to 90% in present-day Mediterranean populations. The latter may have inherited WHG ancestry via EEF introgression.

The Eastern hunter-gatherers (EHG) population identified around the steppes of the Urals also dispersed, and the Scandinavian hunter-gatherers appear to be a mix of WHG and EHG. Around 4500 years ago, the immigration of the Yamnaya and Corded Ware cultures from the eastern steppes brought about Bronze Age Europe, the Proto-Indo-European language, and more or less the present-day genetic makeup of Europeans.

== Cro-Magnon rock shelter ==
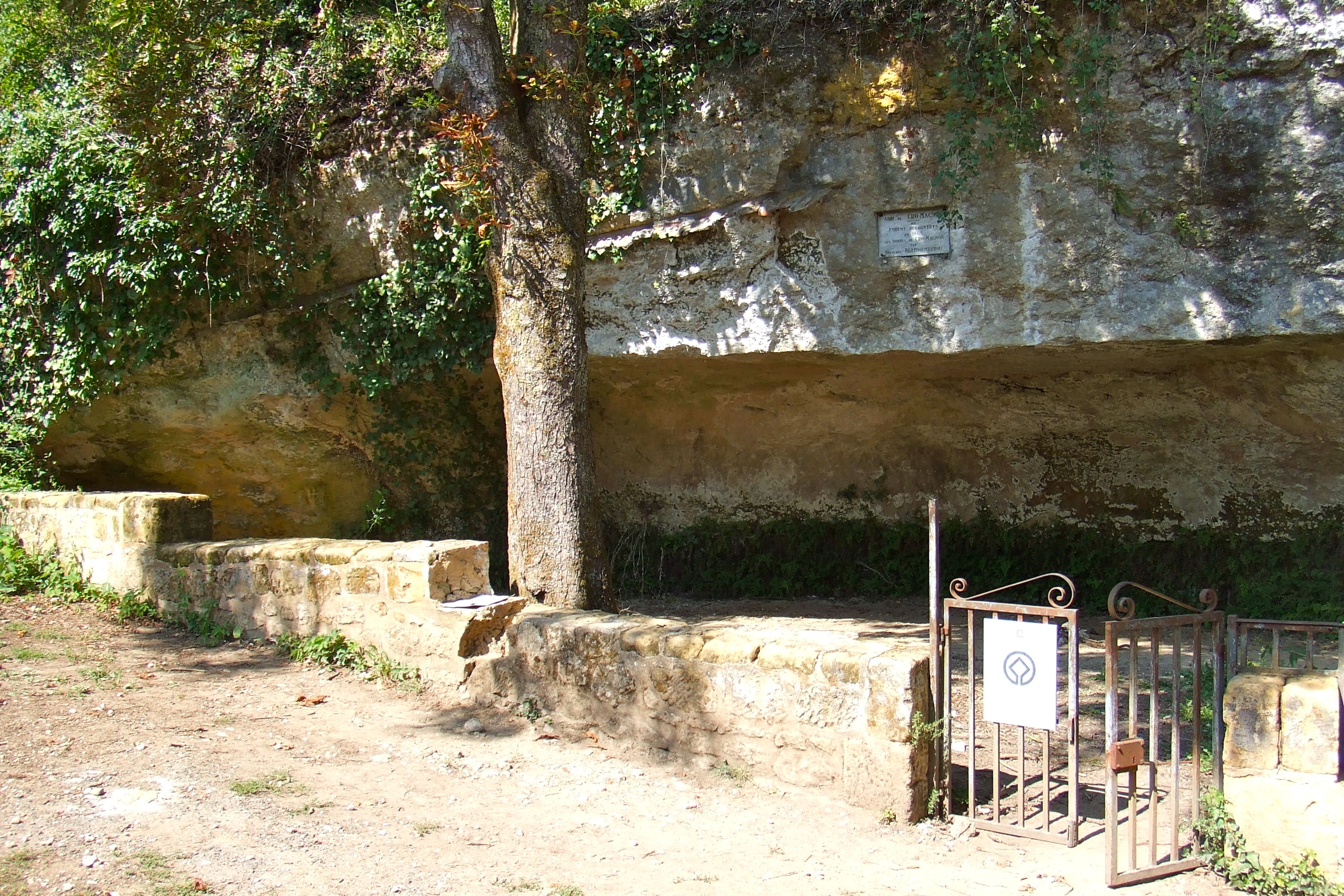
Abri de Cro-Magnon

In 1863, a railway was constructed leading to Les Eyzies, a hamlet in the commune of Les Eyzies-de-Tayac-Sireuil, Dordogne, southwestern France. In 1868, M. François Berthoumeyrou, a contractor, was commissioned to make a road along the railway connecting the new Les Eyzies train station. In March, the road workers dug up a rock shelter, around 10 m (33 ft) deep, on the left bank of the Vézère river. They found flint stone tools, animal bones, and human remains. Berthoumeyrou ordered his men to halt the work and informed the government officials of the discovery. He also informed a local geologist, Abel Laganne, who recovered ornaments, more flints, and two human skulls. As assigned by the French Minister of Public Instruction Victor Duruy to verify the finds, Louis Lartet made systematic excavation and discovered additional human remains, animal bones, stone tools, and ornaments. He deliberated the discovery before the meeting of the Society of Anthropology of Paris on 21 May, the proceedings published in its journal Bulletins et Mémoires de la Société d'Anthropologie de Paris. He described the site as a cemetery and identified the humans as cave dwellers. The site is called Abri de Cro-Magnon (Cro-Magnon rock shelter), now recognised as a UNESCO World Heritage Site. Abri means "shelter" in French, cro means "hole" in Occitan, and Magnon was the landowner. The original human remains were brought to and preserved at the National Museum of Natural History in Paris.

The number of individuals at the Cro-Magnon rock shelter has eluded scientists for over a century. The original workers reported that they found 15 skeletons. In his report, Lartet identified five individuals based on the skulls, three of them males (designated Cro-Magnon 1, 3 and 4), one female (Cro-Magnon 2) and an infant (Cro-Magnon 5). In 1868, anatomist Paul Broca noted five adults and several infants. Broca introduced the specimen names and called Cro-Magnon 1 Le Vieillard, from which the name "Old Man" became popularly used. After complete analyses of individual bones by the early 2000s, it became generally agreed that the rock shelter contained 140 human remains from at least eight individuals: four adults and four infants.

== Classification ==
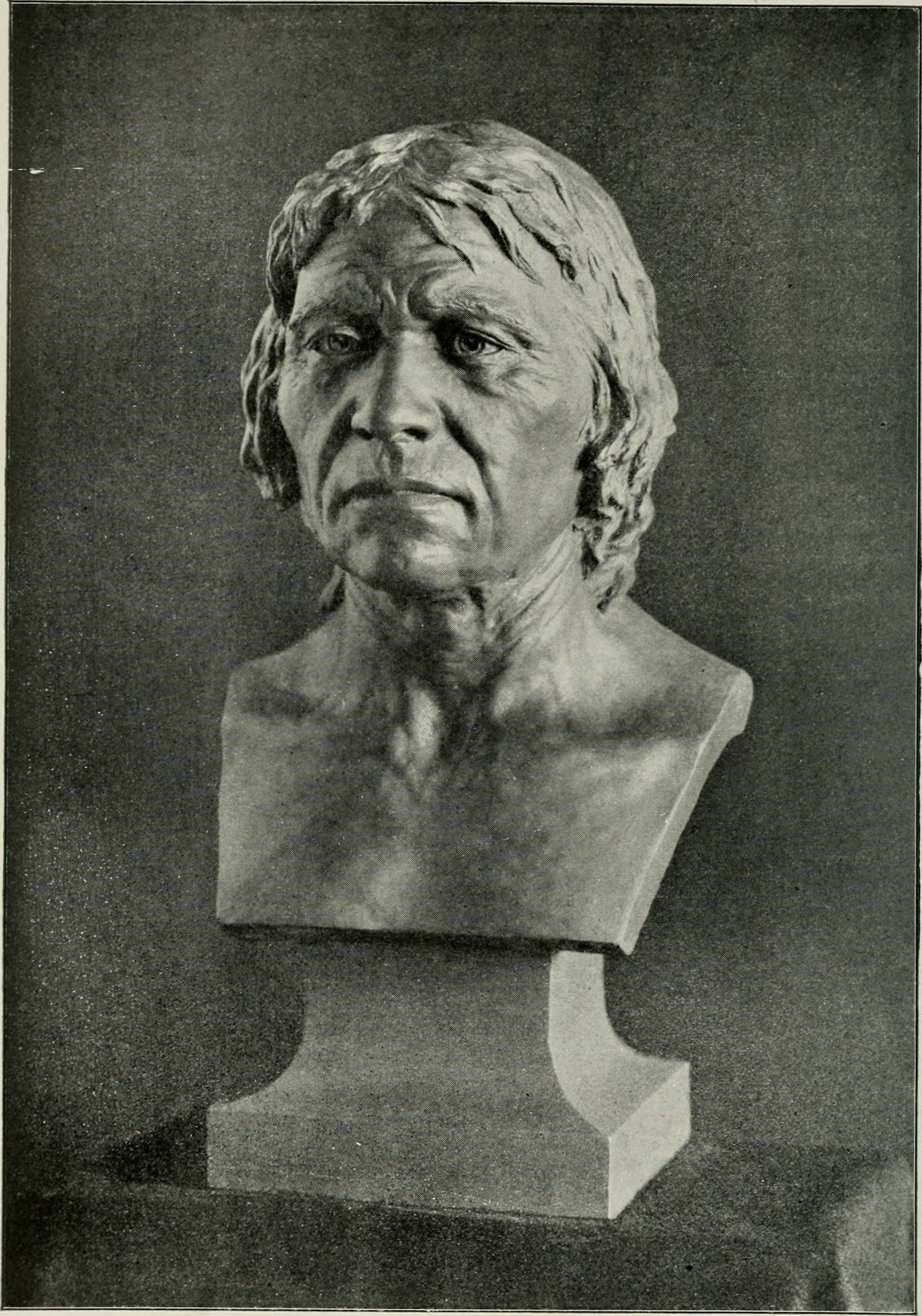
1916 reconstruction of Cro-Magnon 1

Fossils and artifacts from the Palaeolithic had actually been known for decades, but these were interpreted in a creationist model (as the concept of evolution had not yet been conceived). For example, the Aurignacian Red Lady of Paviland (actually a young man) from South Wales was described by geologist Reverend William Buckland in 1822 as a citizen of Roman Britain. Subsequent authors contended the skeleton was either evidence of antediluvian (before the Great Flood) people in Britain, or was swept far from the inhabited lands farther south by the powerful floodwaters. Buckland assumed the specimen was a woman because he was adorned with jewellery (shells, ivory rods and rings, and a wolf-bone skewer), and Buckland also stated (possibly in jest) the jewellery was evidence of witchcraft. Around this time, the uniformitarianism movement was gaining traction, headed principally by Charles Lyell, arguing that fossil materials well predated the biblical chronology.

Following Charles Darwin's 1859 On the Origin of Species, racial anthropologists and raciologists began splitting off putative species and subspecies of present-day humans based on unreliable and pseudoscientific metrics gathered from anthropometry, physiognomy, and phrenology continuing into the 20th century. This was a continuation of Carl Linnaeus' 1735 Systema Naturae, where he invented the modern classification system, in doing so classifying humans as Homo sapiens with several putative subspecies classifications for different races based on racist behavioural definitions (in accord with historical race concepts): "H. s. europaeus" (European descent, governed by laws), "H. s. afer" (African descent, impulse), "H. s. asiaticus" (Asian descent, opinions), and "H. s. americanus" (Native American descent, customs). The racial classification system was quickly extended to fossil specimens, including both Cro-Magnons and the Neanderthals, after the true extent of their antiquity was recognised. In 1869, Lartet had proposed the subspecies classification "H. s. fossilis" for the Cro-Magnon remains. Other supposed fossil human species included (among many others): "H. pre-aethiopicus" for a skull from Dordogne which had "Ethiopic affinities"; "H. predmosti" or "H. predmostensis" for a series of skulls from Brno, Czech Republic, purportedly transitional between Neanderthals and Cro-Magnons; H. mentonensis for a skull from Menton, France; "H. grimaldensis" for Grimaldi man and other skeletons near Grimaldi, Monaco; and "H. aurignacensis" or "H. a. hauseri" for the Combe-Capelle skull.

These fossil races, alongside Ernst Haeckel's idea of there being backwards races which require further evolution (social darwinism), popularised the view in European thought that the civilised white man had descended from primitive, low browed ape ancestors through a series of savage races. Prominent brow-ridges were classified as an ape-like trait; consequently, Neanderthals (as well as Aboriginal Australians) were considered a lowly race. These European fossils were considered to have been the ancestors to specifically living European races. Among the earliest attempts to classify Cro-Magnons was done by racial anthropologists Joseph Deniker and William Z. Ripley in 1900, who characterised them as tall and intelligent proto-Aryans, superior to other races, who descended from Scandinavia and Germany. Further race theories revolved around progressively lighter, blonder, and superior races evolving in Central Europe and spreading out in waves to replace their darker ancestors, culminating in the "Nordic race". These aligned well with Nordicism and Pan-Germanism (that is, Aryan supremacy), which gained popularity just before World War I, and was notably used by the Nazis to justify the conquest of Europe and the supremacy of the German people in World War II. Stature was among the characteristics used to distinguish these sub-races, so taller Cro-Magnons such as specimens from the French Cro-Magnon, Paviland, and Grimaldi sites were classified as ancestral to the "Nordic race", and smaller ones such as Combe-Capelle and Chancelade man (both also from France) were considered the forerunners of either the "Mediterranean race" or "Eskimoids". The Venus figurines—sculptures of pregnant women with exaggerated breasts and thighs—were used as evidence of the presence of the "Negroid race" in Palaeolithic Europe, because they were interpreted as having been based on real women with steatopygia (a condition which causes thicker thighs, common in the women of the San people of Southern Africa) and the hairdos of some are supposedly similar to some seen in Ancient Egypt. By the 1940s, the positivism movement—which fought to remove political and cultural bias from science and had begun about a century earlier—had gained popular support in European anthropology. Due to this movement and raciology's associations with Nazism, raciology fell out of practice.

Early depictions of early modern humans
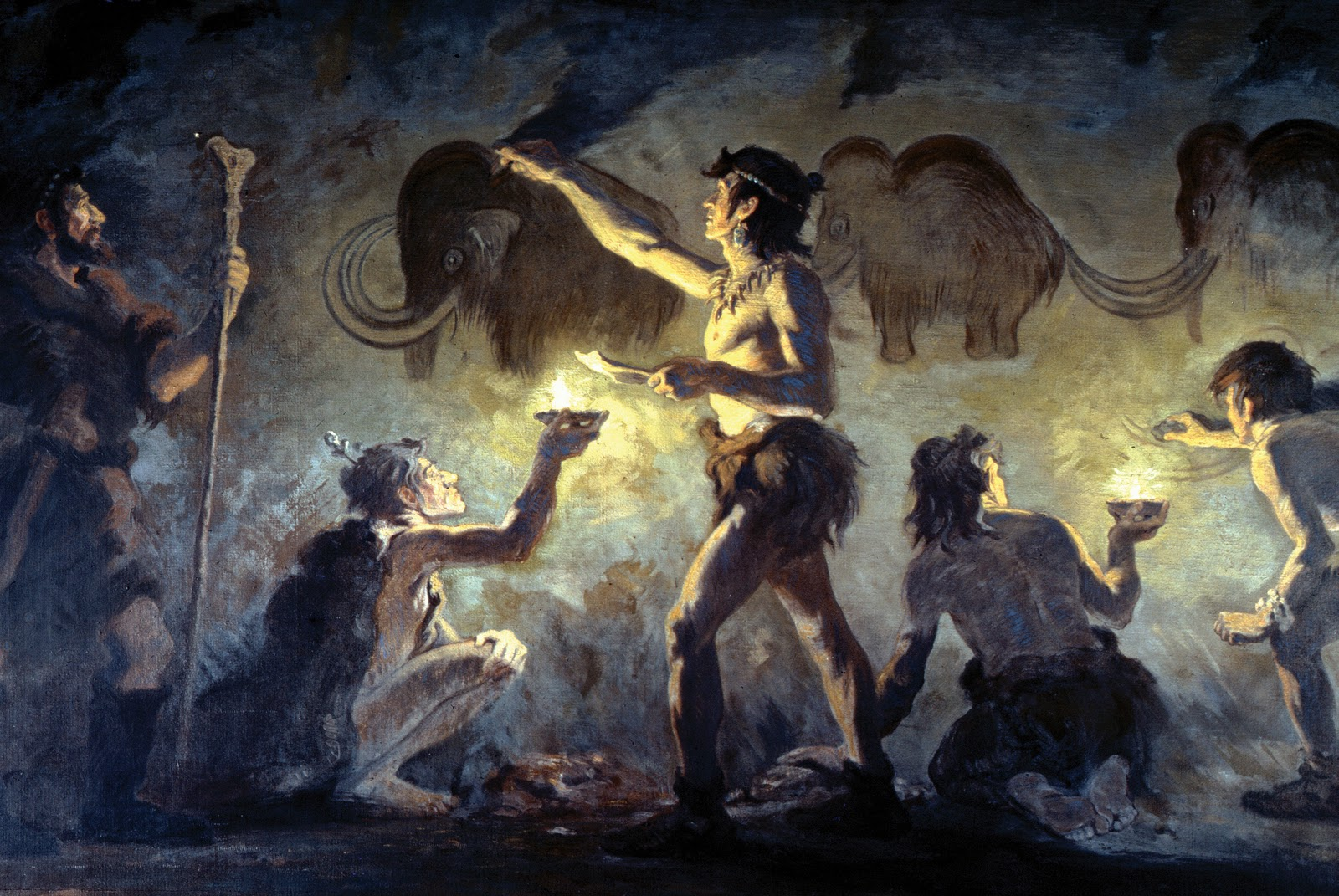
Charles R. Knight's 1920 reconstruction of Magdalenian painters at Font-de-Gaume, France

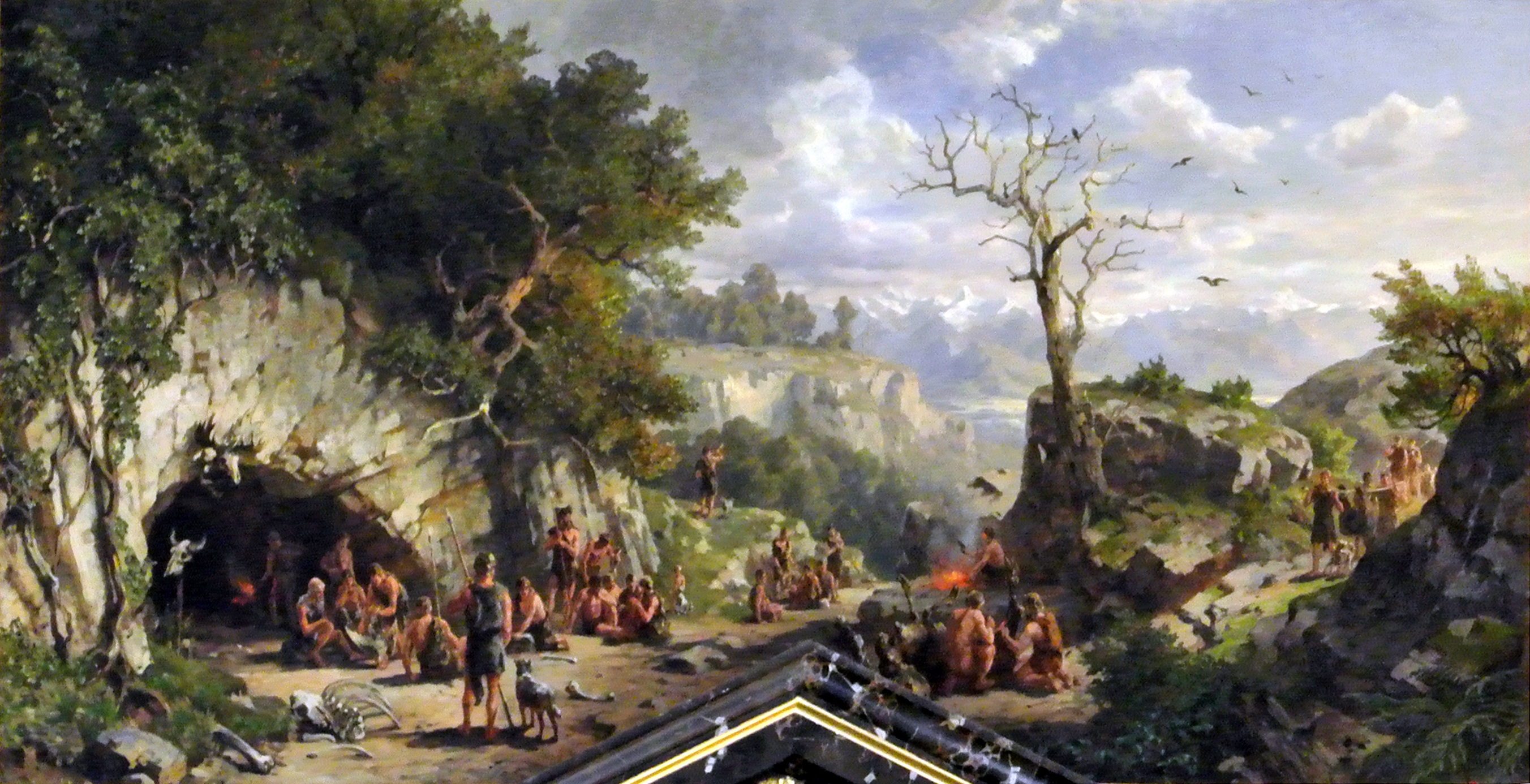
Hugo Darnaut's 1885 Ideal picture from the Stone Age

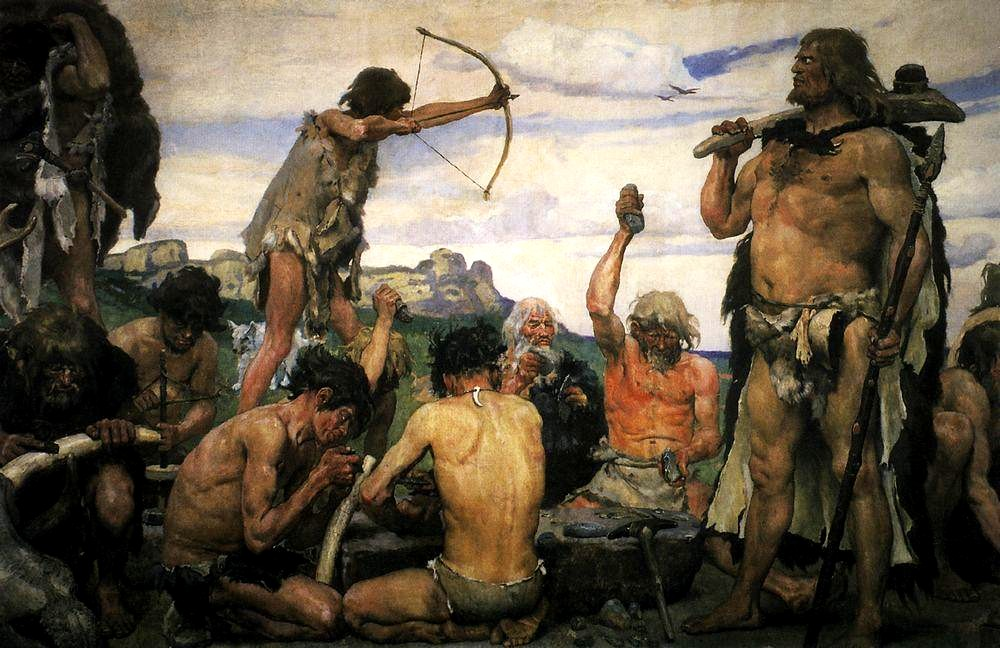
Viktor Vasnetsov's 1882–1885 Stone Age

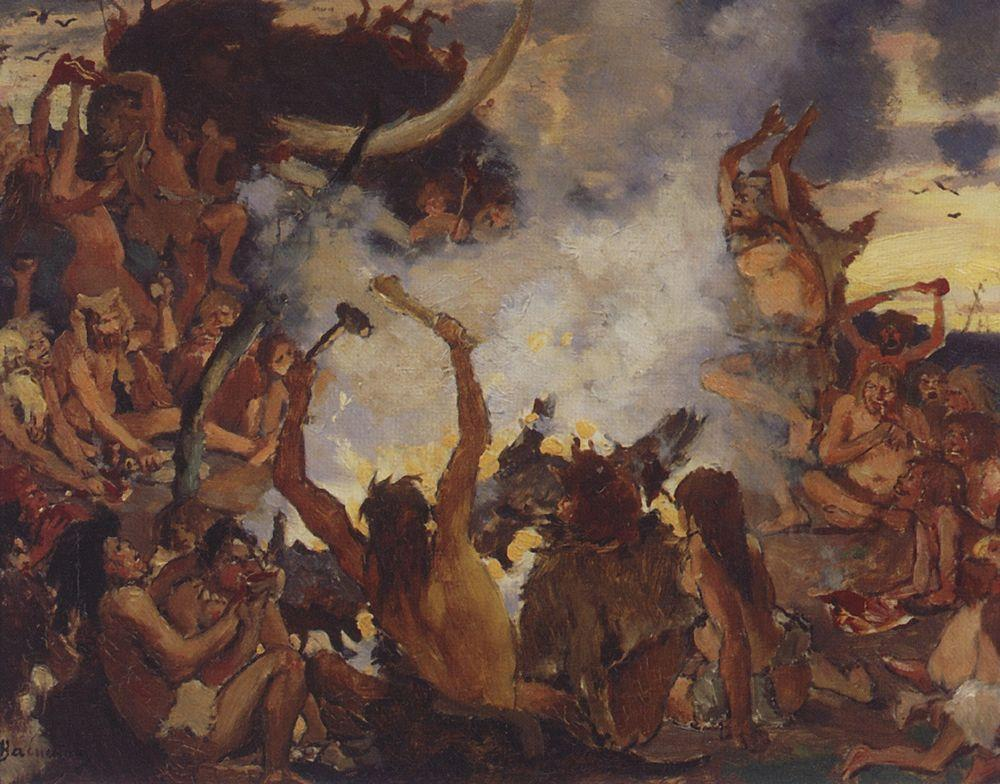
Viktor Vasnetsov's 1883 The Feast

== Demographics ==
The beginning of the Upper Palaeolithic is thought to have been characterised by a major population increase in Europe, with the human population of western Europe possibly increasing by a factor of 10 in the Neanderthal/modern human transition. The archaeological record indicates that the overwhelming majority of Palaeolithic people (both Neanderthals and modern humans) died before reaching the age of 40, with few elderly individuals recorded. It is possible the population boom was caused by a significant increase in fertility rates.

A 2005 study estimated the population of Upper Palaeolithic Europe by calculating the total geographic area which was inhabited based on the archaeological record; averaged the population density of Chipewyan, Hän, Hill people, and Naskapi Native Americans which live in cold climates and applied to this to Cro-Magnons; and assumed that population density continually increased with time calculated by the change in the number of total sites per time period. The study calculated that: from 30,000 to 40,000 years ago the population was roughly 1,700–28,400 (average 4,400); from 22,000 to 30,000 years ago roughly 1,900–30,600 (average 4,800); from 16,500 years to 22,000 ago roughly 2,300–37,700 (average 5,900); and 11,500 to 16,500 years ago roughly 11,300–72,600 (average 28,700).

Following the LGM, Cro-Magnons are thought to have been much less mobile and featured a higher population density, indicated by seemingly shorter trade routes as well as symptoms of nutritional stress.

== Biology ==
=== Physical attributes ===
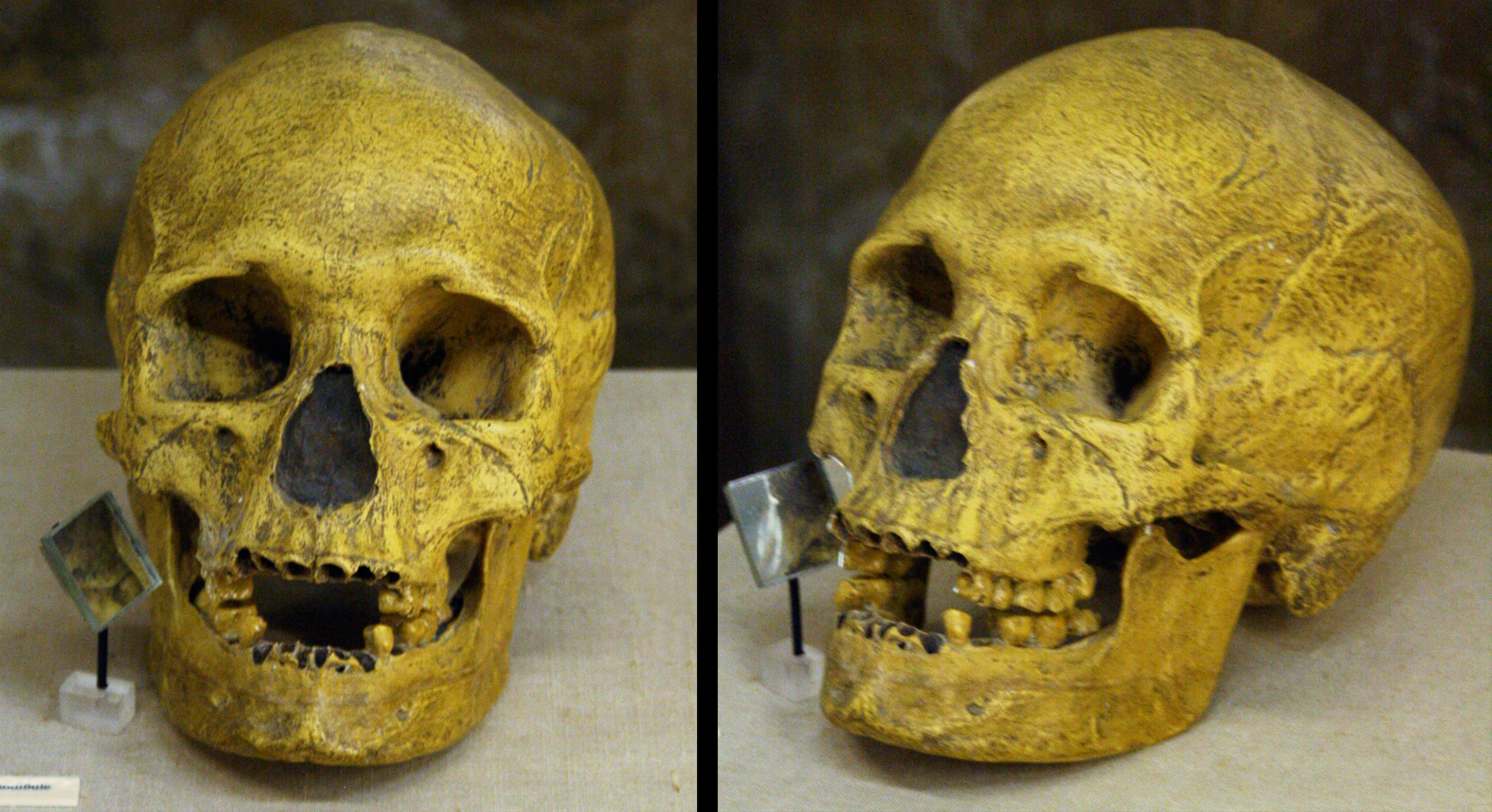
Skull of the Abri Pataud woman

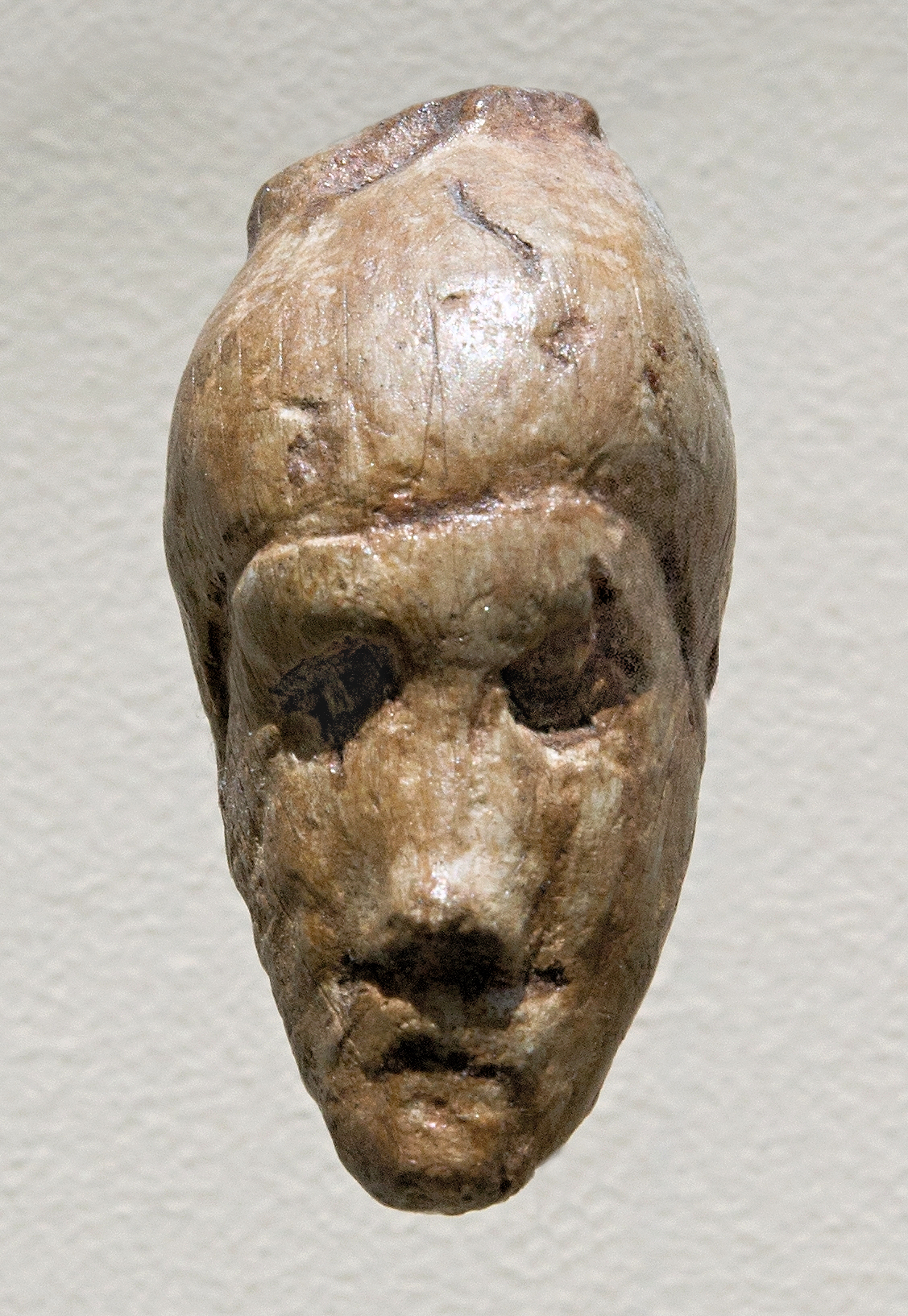
Female face, carved ivory, Dolní Věstonice, Gravettian, c. 26,000 BP

Cro-Magnons are physically similar to present-day humans, with a globular braincase, completely flat face, gracile brow ridge, and defined chin. However, the bones of Cro-Magnons are somewhat thicker and more robust. The earliest Cro-Magnons often display features that are reminiscent of those seen in Neanderthals. Aurignacians in particular featured a higher proportion of traits somewhat reminiscent of Neanderthals, such as (though not limited to) a slightly flattened skullcap and consequent occipital bun protruding from the back of the skull (the latter could be quite defined). Their frequency significantly diminished in Gravettians, and in 2007, palaeoanthropologist Erik Trinkaus concluded these were remnants of Neanderthal introgression which were eventually bred out of the gene pool in his review of the relevant morphology.

For 28 modern human specimens from 25,000 to 190,000 years ago, average brain volume was estimated to have been about 1,478 cc (90.2 cu in), and for 13 Cro-Magnons about 1,514 cc (92.4 cu in). In comparison, present-day humans average 1,350 cc (82 cu in), which is notably smaller. This is because the Cro-Magnon brain, though within the variation for present-day humans, exhibits longer average frontal lobe length and taller occipital lobe height. The parietal lobes, however, are shorter in Cro-Magnons. It is unclear if this could equate to any functional differences between present-day and early modern humans.

In early Upper Palaeolithic western Europe (before the LGM), 20 men and 10 women were estimated to have averaged 176.2 cm (5 ft 9 in) and 162.9 cm (5 ft 4 in), respectively. This is similar to post-industrial modern northern Europeans. In contrast, in a sample of 21 and 15 late Upper Palaeolithic western European men and women (after the LGM), the averages were 165.6 cm (5 ft 5 in) and 153.5 cm (5 ft), similar to pre-industrial modern humans. It is unclear why earlier Cro-Magnons were taller, especially considering that cold-climate creatures are short-limbed and thus short-statured to better retain body heat (Allen's rule). This has variously been explained as: retention of a hypothetically tall ancestral condition; higher-quality diet and nutrition due to the hunting of megafauna which later became uncommon or extinct; functional adaptation to increase stride length and movement efficiency while running during a hunt; increasing territorialism among later Cro-Magnons reducing gene flow between communities and increasing inbreeding rate; or statistical bias due to small sample size or because taller people were more likely to achieve higher status in a group before the LGM and thus were more likely to be buried and preserved.

Prior to genetic analysis, it was generally assumed that Cro-Magnons, like present-day Europeans, were light skinned as an adaptation to better generate vitamin D from the less luminous sun farther north. However, of the three predominant genes responsible for lighter skin in present-day Europeans—KITLG, SLC24A5, and SLC45A2—the latter two, as well as the TYRP1 gene associated with lighter hair and eye colour, experienced positive selection as late as 11,000 to 19,000 years ago during the Mesolithic transition. Such a late timing was potentially caused by overall low population and/or low cross-continental movement required for such an adaptive shift in skin, hair, and eye colouration. However, KITLG experienced positive selection in Cro-Magnons (as well as East Asians) beginning approximately 30,000 years ago.

=== Genetics ===
While anatomically modern humans have been present outside of Africa during some isolated time intervals potentially as early as 250,000 years ago, present-day non-Africans descend from the out of Africa expansion which occurred around 55,000 to 65,000 years ago. This movement was an offshoot of the rapid expansion within East Africa associated with mtDNA haplogroup L3. Mitochondrial DNA analysis places Cro-Magnons as the sister group to Upper Palaeolithic East Asian groups, divergence occurring roughly 50,000 years ago.

Initial genomic studies on the earliest Cro-Magnons in 2014, namely on the 37,000-year-old Kostenki-14 individual, identified three major lineages which are also present in present-day Europeans: one related to all later Cro-Magnons; a "Basal Eurasian" lineage which split from the common ancestor of present-day Europeans and East Asians before they split from each other; and another related to a 24,000-year-old individual from the Siberian Mal'ta–Buret' culture (near Lake Baikal). Contrary to this, Fu et al. (2016), evaluating much earlier European specimens, including Ust'-Ishim and Oase-1 from 45,000 years ago, found no evidence of a "Basal Eurasian" component to the genome, nor did they find evidence of Mal'ta–Buret' introgression when looking at a wider range of Cro-Magnons from the entire Upper Palaeolithic. The study instead concluded that such a genetic makeup in present-day Europeans stemmed from Near Eastern and Siberian introgression occurring predominantly in the Neolithic and the Bronze Age (though beginning by 14,000 years ago), but all Cro-Magnons specimens including and following Kostenki-14 contributed to the present-day European genome and were more closely related to present-day Europeans than East Asians. Earlier Cro-Magnons (10 tested in total), on the other hand, did not seem to be ancestral to any present-day population, nor did they form any cohesive group in and of themselves, each representing either completely distinct genetic lineages, admixture between major lineages, or have highly divergent ancestry. Because of these, the study also concluded that, beginning roughly 37,000 years ago, Cro-Magnons descended from a single founder population and were reproductively isolated from the rest of the world. The study reported that an Aurignacian individual from Grottes de Goyet, Belgium, has more genetic affinities to the Magdalenian inhabitants of Cueva de El Mirón, Spain, than to more or less contemporaneous eastern European Gravettians.

Haplogroups identified in Cro-Magnons are the patrilineal (from father to son) Y-DNA haplogroups the earliest C1, the latest IJ, and K2a; (Note: Kostenki-14 (Russia): C1b, Goyet Q116-1 (Belgium) C1a, Sungir (Russia): C1a2, Ust'-Ishim and Oase-1: K2a) and matrilineal (from mother to child) mt-DNA haplogroup N, R, and U. (Note: Haplogroup N was found in two Gravettian-era fossils, Paglicci 52 Paglicci 12, and is widespread in Central Asia) Y-haplogroup IJ descended from Southwest Asia. Haplogroup I emerged about 30,000 to 35,000 years ago, either in Europe or West Asia. Mt-haplogroup U5 arose in Europe just prior to the LGM, between 25,000 and 35,000 years ago. The 14,000-year-old Villabruna 1 skeleton from Ripari Villabruna, Italy, is the oldest identified bearer of Y-haplogroup R1b (R1b1a-L754* (xL389,V88)) found in Europe, likely brought in from eastern introgression. The Azilian "Bichon man" skeleton from the Swiss Jura was found to be associated with the WHG lineage. He was a bearer of Y-DNA haplogroup I2a and mtDNA haplogroup U5b1h.

Genetic evidence suggests early modern humans interbred with Neanderthals. Genes in the present-day genome are estimated to have entered about 47,000 to 65,000 years ago, most likely in West Asia soon after modern humans left Africa. In 2015, the 40,000-year-old modern human Oase 1 was found to have had 6–9% (point estimate 7.3%) Neanderthal DNA, indicating a Neanderthal ancestor up to four to six generations earlier, but this hybrid Romanian population does not appear to have made a substantial contribution to the genomes of later Europeans. Therefore, it is possible that interbreeding was common between Neanderthals and Cro-Magnons which did not contribute to the present-day genome. The percentage of Neanderthal genes gradually decreased with time, which could indicate they were maladaptive and were selected out of the gene pool.

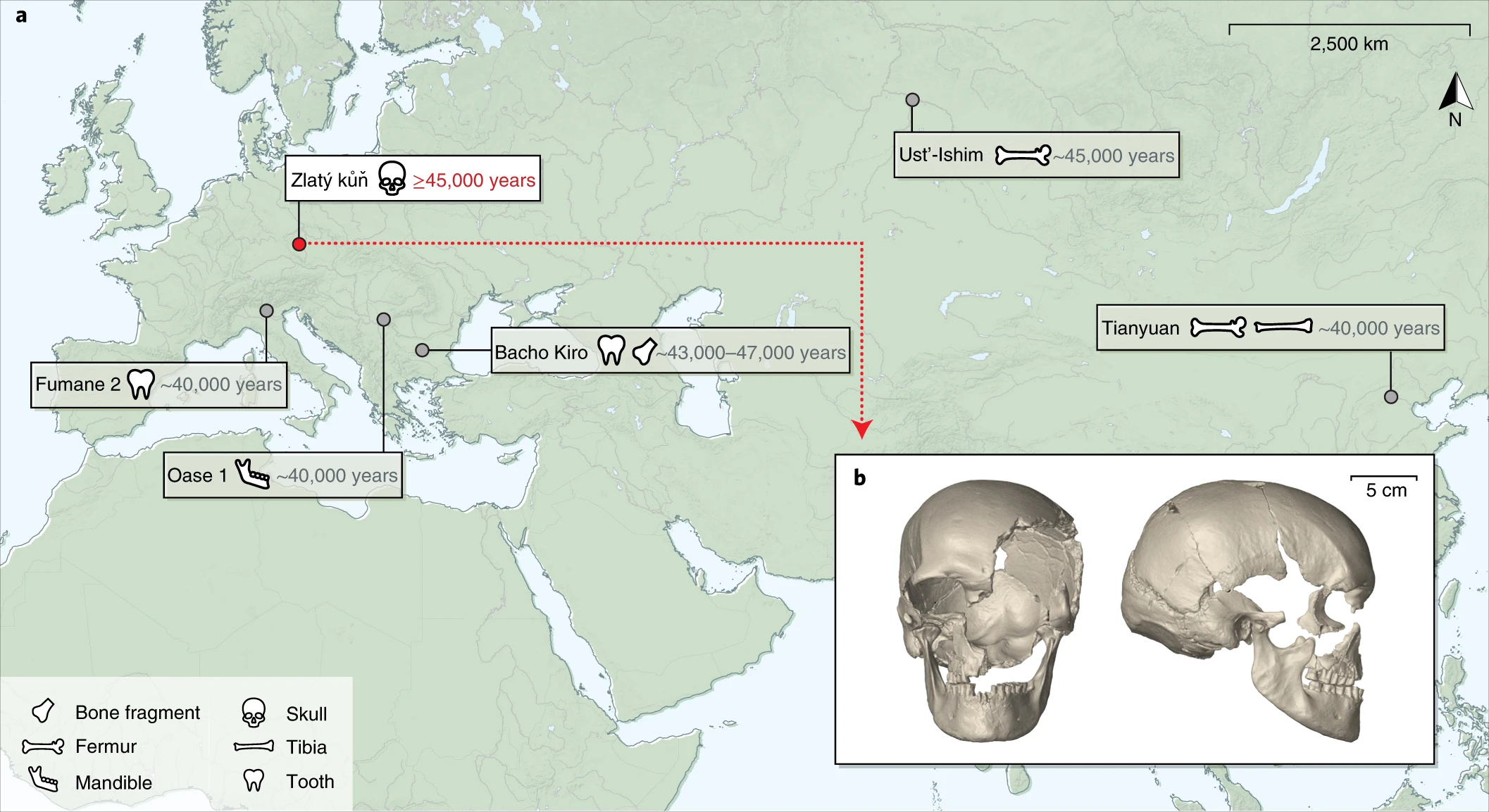
Location of the Zlatý kůň fossil with an age of at least ~40,000 years, that yielded genome-wide data

Vallini et al. 2022 found that Europe was populated by three distinct lineages. The earliest inhabitants (represented by Zlaty Kun ~50kya) split from the common Eurasian lineage before the divergence of Western and Eastern Eurasians, but after the divergence of the hypothetical Basal Eurasians. This earliest sample did not cluster with any modern human population, including Africans, and died out without leaving ancestry to modern peoples. The second wave associated with the Initial Upper Paleolithic wave (represented by Bacho Kiro ~45kya) appeared to be more closely related to modern East Asians and Australasians compared to Europeans, suggesting that this lineage split initially after the formation of Eastern Eurasians, and migrated instead northwestwards into Europe. The third wave associated with Ancient West Eurasians (represented by Kostenki14 and GoyetQ116-1 ~38kya) absorbed the preceding population of the second wave. Proper Aurignacian people, represented by the GoyetQ116-1 specimen were still part of a larger Western Eurasian "meta-population", but also carried ancestry from the preceding IUP-affiliated groups. Evidence for at least some IUP legacy among later UP Europeans is the presence of Ancient East Eurasian ancestry (c. 17–23%) among the Aurignacian-affiliated GoyetQ116-1 specimen, while the Kostenki-14 specimen did not display evidence for IUP-affiliated admixture. Villalba-Mouco et al. (2023) noted that this IUP-affiliated ancestry is either affiliated with East Asians or a "pan-Eurasian" population which pre-dated the split between European and Asian populations, but contributed significantly to the Tianyuan man, and less to GoyetQ116-1. The IUP-affiliated ancestry among GoyetQ116-1 can also be explained by Tianyuan-like geneflow, evident by "excess shared ancestry between Tianyuan and MLZ/Goyet Q116-1".

Another West Eurasian-affiliated Upper Paleolithic culture was the Gravettian industry, represented by the Sungir, the Vestonice, and the Fournol clusters, with less or no IUP-affiliated ancestry (0–14%), possibly mediated indirectly via Aurignacian (Goyet-like) geneflow. The IUP or Tianyuan-like admixture (c. 2%) among the Upper Paleolithic Sunghir (34kya) population is consistent with a low amount of Denisovan ancestry among them, yet absent from the Kostenki14 specimen, which is regarded as "baseline" for West Eurasian (European-related) ancestry.

The Gravettian and Aurignacian as well as the Solutrean cultures would later give rise to the Magdalenian material culture, which subsequently became absorbed by the Epigravettian wave from Western Asia (Anatolia). In a genetic study published in Nature in March 2023, the authors found that the ancestors of the Western Hunter-Gatherers (WHGs) were populations associated with the Epigravettian culture, which largely replaced populations associated with the Magdalenian culture about 14,000 years ago.

== Culture ==
There is a notable technological complexification coinciding with the replacement of Neanderthals with Cro-Magnons in the archaeological record, and so the terms "Middle Palaeolithic" and "Upper Palaeolithic" were created to distinguish between these two time periods. Largely based on western European archaeology, the transition was dubbed the "Upper Palaeolithic Revolution," (extended to be a worldwide phenomenon) and the idea of "behavioural modernity" became associated with this event and early modern cultures. It is largely agreed that the Upper Palaeolithic seems to feature a higher rate of technological and cultural evolution than the Middle Palaeolithic, but it is debated if behavioural modernity was truly an abrupt development or was a slow progression initiating far earlier than the Upper Paleolithic, especially when considering the non-European archaeological record. Practices considered modern include: the production of microliths, the common use of bone and antler, the common use of grinding and pounding tools, high quality evidence of body decoration and figurine production, long-distance trade networks, and improved hunting technology. In regard to art, the Magdalenian produced some of the most intricate Palaeolithic pieces, and they even elaborately decorated normal, everyday objects.

=== Hunting and gathering ===
Palaeolithic peoples are typically characterised as having had a meat-heavy diet, with an emphasis on big prey items, although foodprints such as dental macrowear show that their diets varied greatly depending on geography; high latitude populations in boreal forests and mammoth steppes did heavily subsist on meat, but Mediterranean populations ate extremely diverse arrays of both plants and animals. The LGM extirpated most European megafauna (Quaternary extinction event), and similarly post-LGM peoples tend to have a higher rate of nutrient-deficiency-related ailments, including a reduction in average height. Probably due to the contraction of habitable territory, these bands were subsisting on a much broader food range of plants, smaller animals, and aquatic resources (broad spectrum revolution).

Historically, ethnographic studies on hunter-gatherer subsistence strategies have long placed emphasis on sexual division of labour and most especially the hunting of big game by men. This culminated in the 1966 book Man the Hunter, which focuses almost entirely on the importance of male contributions of food to the group. As this was published during the second-wave feminism movement, this was quickly met with backlash from many female anthropologists. Among these was Australian archaeologist Betty Meehan in her 1974 article Woman the Gatherer, who argued that women play a vital role in these communities by gathering more reliable food plants and small game, as big game hunting has a low success rate. The concept of "Woman the Gatherer" has since gained significant support.

==== Prey items ====
It has typically been assumed that Cro-Magnons closely studied prey habits in order to maximise return depending on the season. For example, large mammals (including red deer, horses, and ibex) congregate seasonally, and reindeer were possibly seasonally plagued by insects rendering fur sometimes unsuitable for hideworking. In particularly southwestern France, Cro-Magnons depended heavily upon reindeer, and so it is hypothesised that these communities followed the herds, with occupation of the Perigord and the Pyrenees only occurring in the summer. Epi-Gravettian communities, especially, generally focused on hunting one species of large game, most commonly horse or bison.

There is much evidence that Cro-Magnons, especially in western Europe following the LGM, corralled large prey animals into natural confined spaces (such as against a cliff wall, a cul-de-sac, or a water body) in order to efficiently slaughter whole herds of animals (game drive system). They seem to have scheduled mass kills to coincide with migration patterns, in particular for red deer, horses, reindeer, bison, aurochs, and ibex, and occasionally woolly mammoths. Game drive systems became especially popular following the LGM, possibly an extension of increasing food return.

There are also multiple examples of consumption of seasonally abundant fish, becoming more prevalent in the mid-Upper-Palaeolithic. Nonetheless, Magdalenian peoples appear to have had a greater dependence on small animals, aquatic resources, and plants than predecessors, probably due to the relative scarcity of European big game following the LGM (Quaternary extinction event).

It is possible that human activity, in addition to the rapid retreat of favourable steppeland, inhibited recolonisation of most of Europe by megafauna following the LGM (such as mammoths, woolly rhinoceroses, Irish elk, and cave lions), in part contributing to their extinction which occurred by the beginning of or well into the Holocene depending on the species.

==== Plant items ====
Most archaeobotanical studies on Pleistocene plant gathering and processing techniques focus on the end of the Paleolithic as precursors to agriculture in the Neolithic. While isotopic studies indicate nearly all nutritional requirements of Palaeolithic populations may have been mostly satisfied by meat, similar to Inuit cuisine, the issue of offsetting protein poisoning (nitrogen overloading) by eating fatty foods (blubber most especially in the Inuit diet) becomes problematic in more temperate climates with leaner prey. The isotopic score for Palaeolithic peoples are comparable to Inuit with a diet comprising 1–4% plant components, but also to Onge from the tropical Andaman Islands, Paraguayan Aché, Arnhem Land Aboriginals, and Venezuelan Hiwi whose diets comprise up to 25% plant components. Thus, the importance of plants may have varied greatly depending on local climatic conditions.

The Palaeolithic archaeobotanical record outside Europe (especially in the Middle East) shows these peoples were capable of processing an ample range of plant resources, in the 20,000-year-old Israeli Ohalo II site as many as 150 types of seeds, fruits, nuts, and starches. There are several European Mediterranean cave sites dating to near the end of the Palaeolithic which suggest the inhabitants were harvesting acorn, almond, pistacia, hawthorn, wild pear, blackthorn, rosehip, sorbus, and grape. Multiple German sites bear evidence of wild cherry, blackberry, dewberry, and raspberry consumption. The Palaeolithic archaeobotanical record becomes sparser farther north, but water caltrop and water lily tubers are consumed at least in the northern European Mesolithic. It is unclear to what extent they would process or pretreat otherwise inedible plants which require multiple steps (such as a combination of fermenting, grinding, boiling, etc.).

==== Weaponry ====
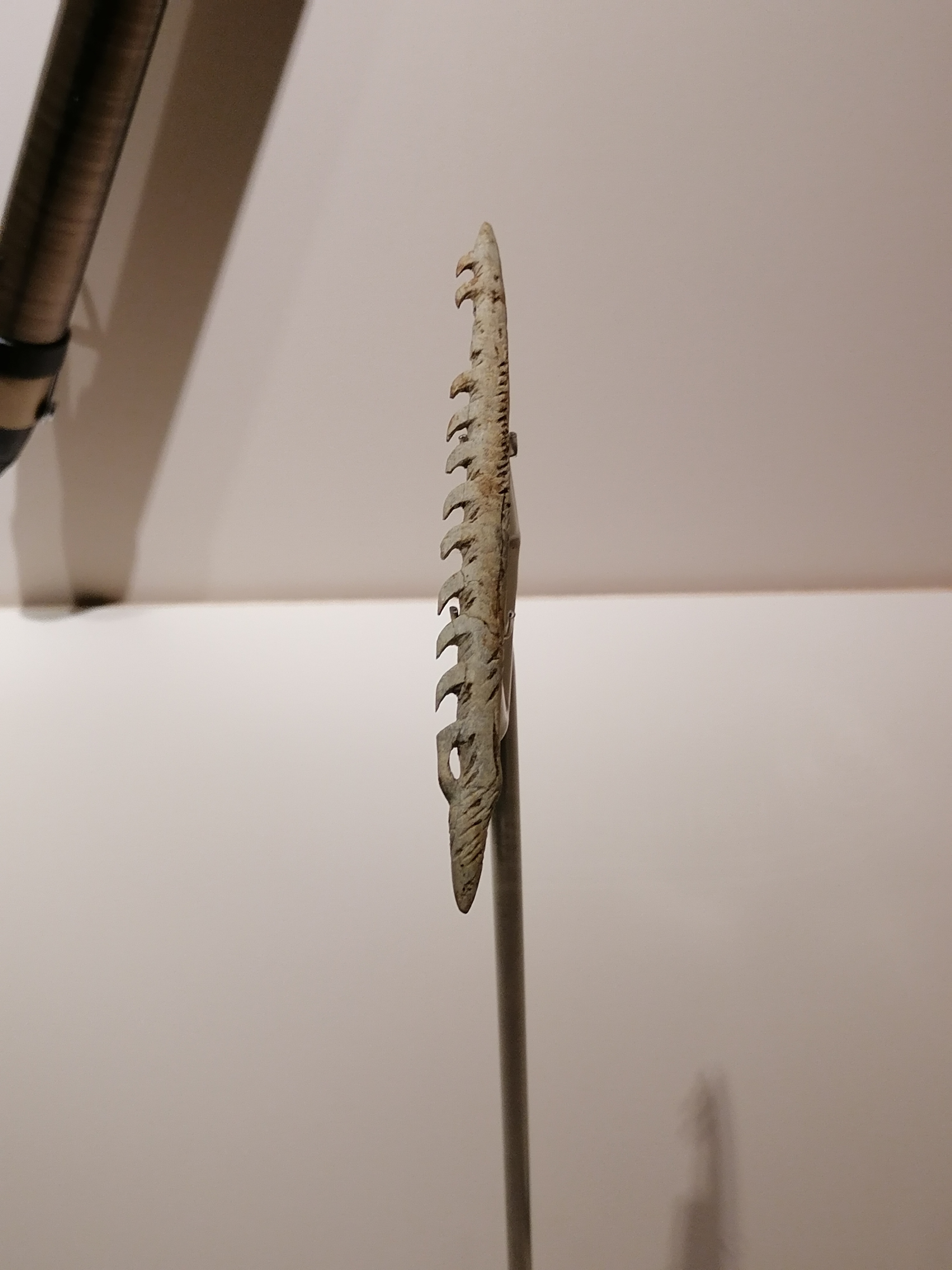
Magdalenian bone barbed point from Cueva de Santimamiñe, in Bilbao Archaeology Museum

For weapons, Cro-Magnons crafted spearpoints using predominantly bone and antler, possibly because these materials were readily abundant. Compared to stone, these materials are compressive, making them fairly shatterproof. These were then hafted onto a shaft to be used as javelins. It is possible that Aurignacian craftsmen further hafted bone barbs onto the spearheads; however, firm evidence of such technology is recorded earliest 23,500 years ago, and does not become more common until the Mesolithic. Aurignacian craftsmen produced lozenge-shaped (diamond-like) spearheads. By 30,000 years ago, spearheads were manufactured with a more rounded-off base, and by 28,000 years ago spindle-shaped heads were introduced.

During the Gravettian, spearheads with a bevelled base were being produced. By the beginning of the LGM, the spear-thrower was invented in Europe, which can increase the force and accuracy of the projectile. A possible boomerang made of mammoth tusk was identified in Poland (though it may have been unable to return to the thrower), and dating to 23,000 years ago, it would be the oldest known boomerang. Stone spearheads with leaf- and shouldered-points become more prevalent in the Solutrean. Both large and small spearheads were produced in great quantity, and the smaller ones may have been attached to projectile darts. Archery was possibly invented in the Solutrean, though less ambiguous bow technology is first reported in the Mesolithic. Bone technology was revitalised in the Magdalanian, and long-range technology as well as harpoons become much more prevalent. Some harpoon fragments are speculated to have been leisters or tridents, and true harpoons are commonly found along seasonal salmon migration routes.

=== Society ===
==== Social system ====
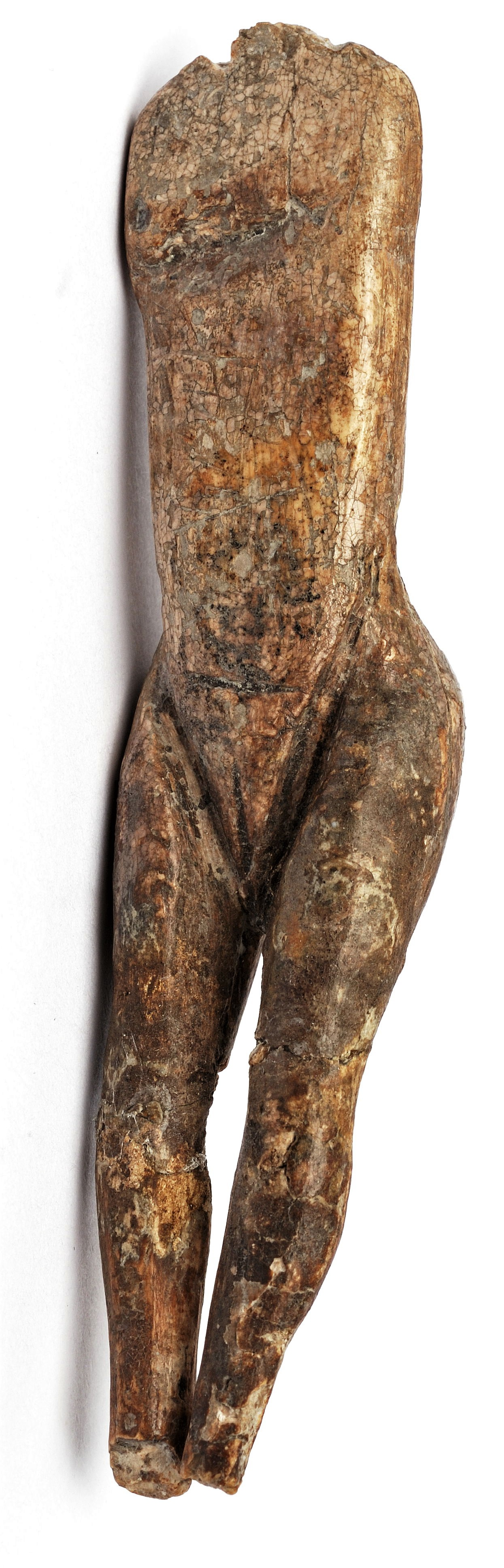
The first Venus discovered, the "Vénus impudique" ("immodest Venus"), possibly of a young girl

As opposed to the patriarchy prominent in historical societies, the idea of a prehistoric predominance of either matriarchy or matrifocal families (centred on motherhood) was first supposed in 1861 by legal scholar Johann Jakob Bachofen. The earliest models of this believed that monogamy was not widely practiced in ancient times—thus, the paternal line was resultantly more difficult to keep track of than the maternal—resulting in a matrilineal (and matriarchal) society. Matriarchs were then conquered by patriarchs at the dawn of civilisation. The switch from matriarchy to patriarchy and the hypothetical adoption of monogamy was seen as a leap forward. However, when the first Palaeolithic representations of humans were discovered, the so-called Venus figurines—which typically feature pronounced breasts, buttocks, and vulvas (areas generally sexualised in present-day Western Culture)—they were initially interpreted as pornographic in nature. The first Venus discovered was named the "Vénus impudique" ("immodest Venus") by the discoverer Paul Hurault, 8th Marquis de Vibraye, because it lacked clothes and had a prominent vulva. The name "Venus", after the Roman goddess of beauty, in itself implies an erotic function. Such a pattern in the representation of the human form led to suggestions that human forms were generally pornography for men, meaning men were primarily responsible for artwork and craftsmanship in the Palaeolithic whereas women were tasked with child rearing and various domestic works. This would equate to a patriarchal social system.

The Palaeolithic matriarchy model was adapted by prominent communist Friedrich Engels, who instead argued that women were robbed of power by men due to economic changes which could only be undone with the adoption of communism (Marxist feminism). The former sentiment was adopted by the first-wave feminism movement, who attacked the patriarchy by making Darwinist arguments of a supposed natural egalitarian or matrifocal state of human society instead of patriarchal, as well as interpreting the Venuses as evidence of mother goddess worship as part of some matriarchal religion. Consequently, by the mid-20th century, the Venuses were primarily interpreted as evidence of some Palaeolithic fertility cult. Such claims died down in the 1970s as archaeologists moved away from the highly speculative models produced by the previous generation. Through the second-wave feminism movement, the prehistoric matriarchal religion hypothesis was primarily propelled by Lithuanian-American archaeologist Marija Gimbutas. Her interpretations of the Palaeolithic were notably involved in the Goddess movement. Equally ardent arguments against the matriarchy hypothesis have also been prominent, such as American religious scholar Cynthia Eller's 2000 The Myth of Matriarchal Prehistory.

Looking at the archaeological record, depictions of women are markedly more common than of men. In contrast to the commonplace Venuses in the Gravettian, Gravettian depictions of men are rare and contested, the only reliable one being a fragmented ivory figurine from the grave of a Pavlovian site in Brno, Czech Republic (it is also the only statuette found in a Palaeolithic grave). 2-D Magdalenian engravings from 11,000 to 15,000 years ago do depict males, indicated by an erect penis and facial hair, though profiles of women with an exaggerated buttock are much more common. There are less than 100 depictions of males in the Cro-Magnons archaeological record (of them, about a third are depicted with erections.) On the other hand, most individuals which received a burial (which may have been related to social status) were men. Anatomically, the robustness of limbs (which is an indicator of strength) between Cro-Magnon men and women were consistently not appreciably different from each other. Such low levels of sexual dimorphism through the Upper Pleistocene could potentially mean that sexual division of labour, which characterises historic societies (both agricultural and hunter-gatherer), only became commonplace in the Holocene.

==== Trading ====
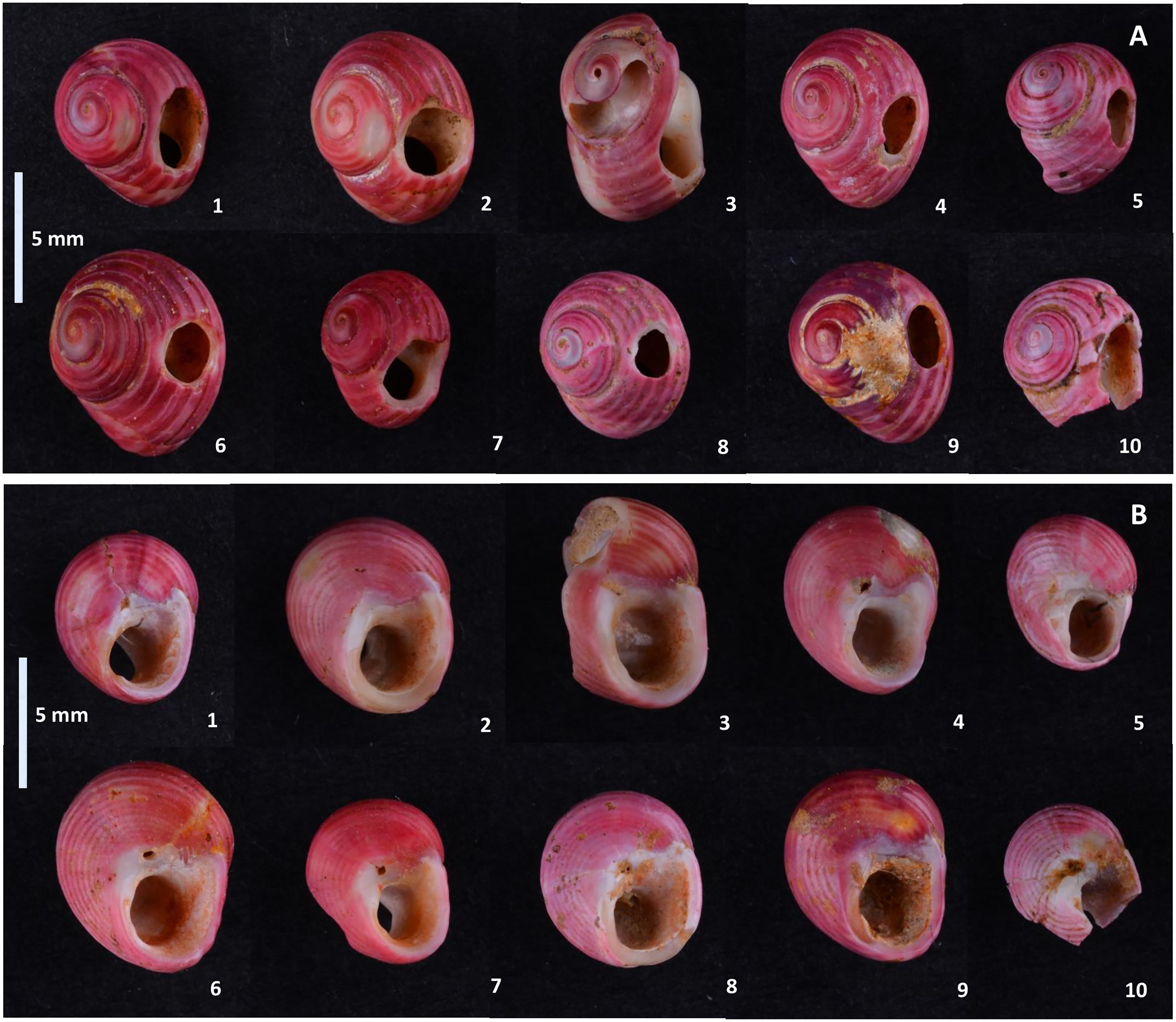
Perforated Homalopoma sanguineum shells (top and underside views) from Poiana Cireşului, Romania, sourced at least 900 km (560 mi) away

The Upper Palaeolithic is characterised by evidence of expansive trade routes and the great distances at which communities could maintain interactions. The early Upper Palaeolithic is especially known for highly mobile lifestyles, with Gravettian groups (at least those analysed in Italy and Moravia, Ukraine) often sourcing some raw materials upwards of 200 km (120 mi). However, it is debated if this represents sample bias, and if western and northern Europe were less mobile. Some cultural practices such as creating Venus figurines or specific burial rituals during the Gravettian stretched 2,000 km (1,200 mi) across the continent. Genetic evidence suggests that, despite strong evidence of cultural transmission, Gravettian Europeans did not introgress into Siberians, meaning there was a movement of ideas but not people between Europe and Siberia. At the 30,000-year-old Romanian Poiana Cireşului site, perforated shells of the Homalopoma sanguineum sea snail were recovered, which is significant as it inhabits the Mediterranean at nearest 900 km (560 mi) away. Such interlinkage may have been an important survival tool, with the steadily deteriorating climate. Given low estimated population density, this may have required a rather complex, cross-continental social organisation system.

By and following the LGM, population densities are thought to have been much higher with the marked decrease of habitable lands, resulting in more regional economies. Decreased land availability could have increased travel distance, as habitable refugia may have been few and far between, and increasing population density within these few refugia would have made long-distance travel less economic. This trend continued into the Mesolithic with the adoption of sedentism. At Ekain, Basque Country, the inhabitants were using the locally rare manganese mineral groutite in their paintings, which they possibly mined out of the cave itself. Nonetheless, there is some evidence of long-distance Magdalenian trade routes. For example, at Lascaux, a painting of a bull had remnants of the manganese mineral hausmannite, which can only be manufactured in heat in excess of 900 °C (1,650 °F), which was probably impossible for Cro-Magnons; this means they likely encountered natural hausmannite which is known to be found 250 km (160 mi) away in the Pyrenees. Unless there was a hausmannite source much closer to Lascaux which has since been depleted, this could mean that there was a local economy based on manganese ores. Based on the distribution of Mediterranean and Atlantic seashell jewellery even well inland, there may have been a network during the Late Glacial Interstadial (14 to 12,000 years ago) along the rivers Rhine and Rhône in France, Germany, and Switzerland.

==== Housing ====
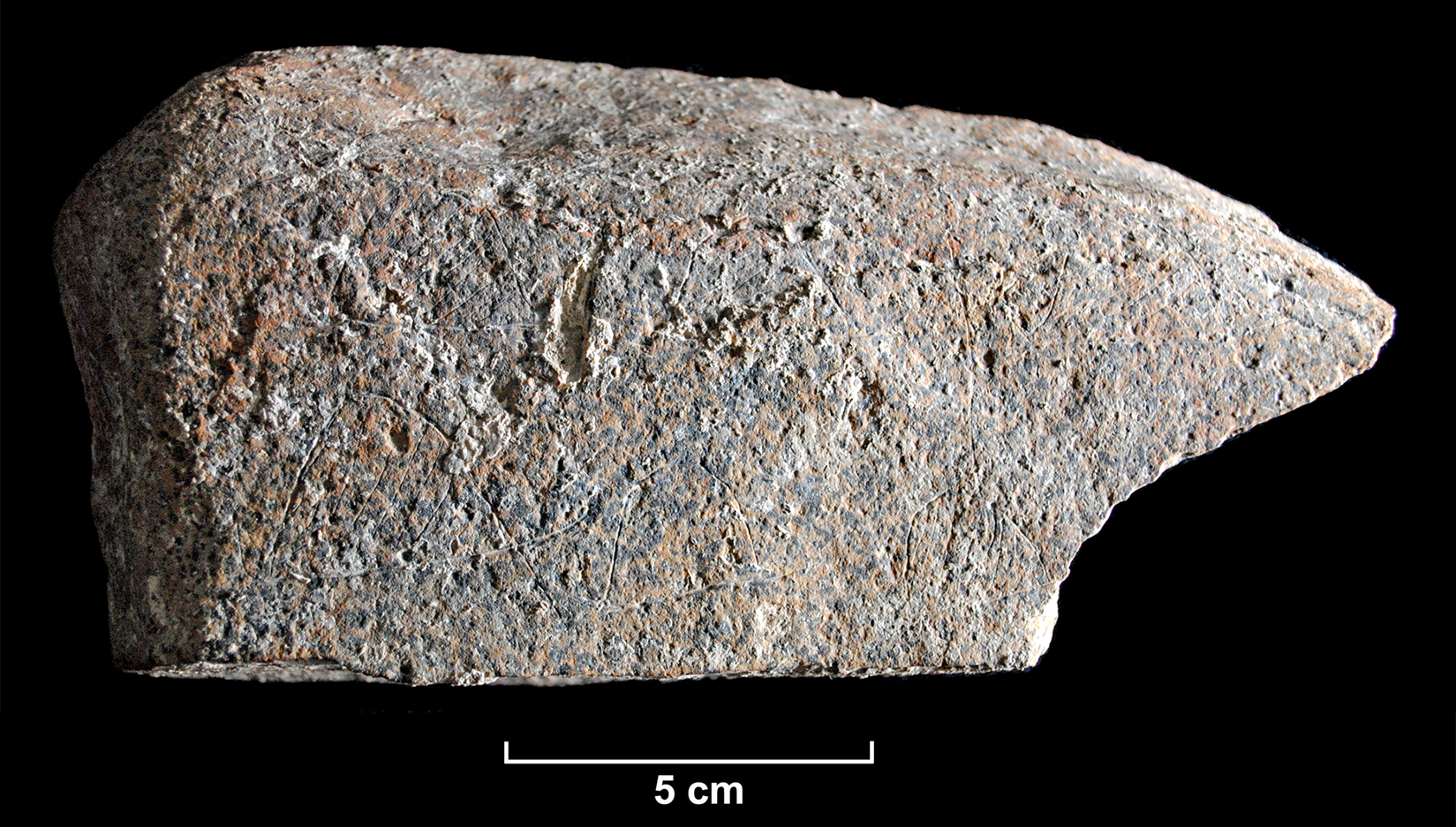
13,800-year-old slab from Molí del Salt, Spain, with engravings speculated to be huts

Cro-Magnon cave sites quite often feature distinct spatial organisation, with certain areas specifically designated for specific activities, such as hearth areas, kitchens, butchering grounds, sleeping grounds, and trash pile. It is difficult to tell if all material from a site was deposited at about the same time, or if the site was used multiple times. Cro-Magnons are thought to have been quite mobile, indicated by the great lengths of trade routes, and such a lifestyle was likely supported by the constructions of temporary shelters in open environments, such as huts. Evidence of huts is typically associated with a hearth.

Magdalenian peoples, especially, are thought to have been highly migratory, following herds while repopulating Europe, and several cave and open-air sites indicate the area was abandoned and revisited regularly. The 19,000-year-old Peyre Blanque site, France, and at least the 260 km^{2} (100 sq mi) area around it may have been revisited for thousands of years. In the Magdalenian, stone lined rectangular areas typically 6–15 m^{2} (65–161 sq ft) were interpreted as having been the foundations or flooring of huts. At Magdalenian Pincevent, France, small, circular dwellings were speculated to have existed based on the spacing of stone tools and bones; these sometimes featured an indoor hearth, work area, or sleeping space (but not all at the same time). A 23,000-year-old hut from the Israeli Ohalo II was identified as having used grasses as flooring or possibly bedding, but it is unclear if Cro-Magnons also lined their huts with grass or instead used animal pelts. A 13,800-year-old slab from Molí del Salt, Spain, has 7 dome-shaped figures engraved onto it, which are postulated to represent temporary dome-shaped huts.

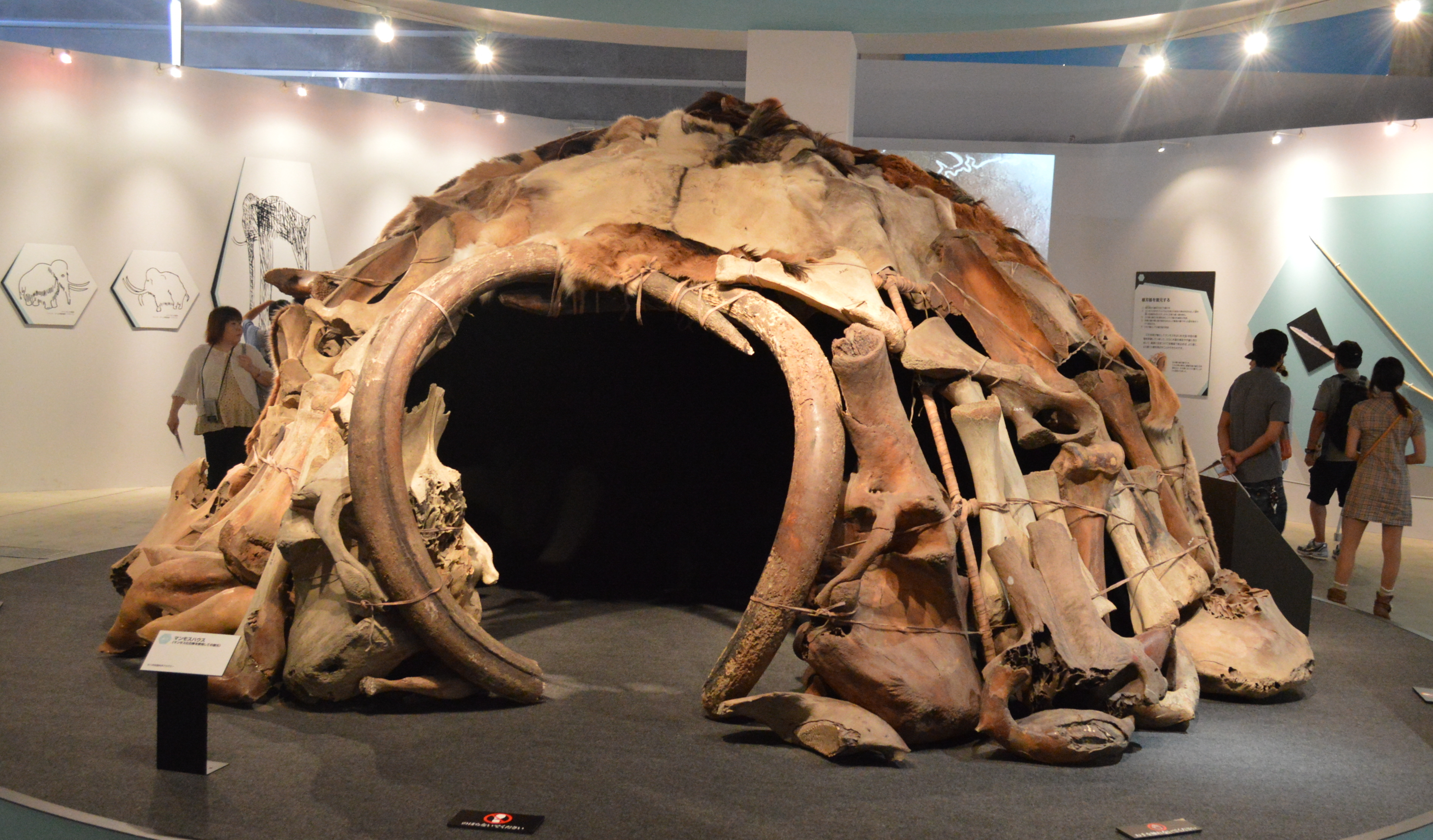
Reconstruction of a mammoth hut from Mezhyrich, Ukraine

Over 70 dwellings constructed by Cro-Magnons out of mammoth bones have been identified, primarily from the Russian Plain, possibly semi-permanent hunting camps. They seem to have built tipis and yarangas. These were typically constructed following the LGM after 22,000 years ago by Epi-Gravettian peoples; the earliest hut identified comes from the Molodova I site, Ukraine, which was dated to 44,000 years ago (making it possible it was built by Neanderthals). Typically, these huts measured 5 m (16 ft) in diameter, or 4 m × 6 m (13 ft × 20 ft) if oval shaped. Huts could get as small as 3 m × 2 m (9.8 ft × 6.6 ft). One of the largest huts has a diameter of 12.5 m (41 ft)—a 25,000-year-old hut identified in Kostenki, Russia—and was constructed out of 64 mammoth skulls, but given the little evidence of occupation, this is postulated to have been used for food storage rather than as a living space. Some huts have burned bones, which has typically been interpreted as bones used as fuel for fireplaces due to the scarcity of firewood, and/or disposal of waste. A few huts, however, have evidence of wood burning, or mixed wood/bone burning.

Mammoth hut foundations were generally made by pushing a great quantity of mammoth skulls into the ground (most commonly, though not always, with the tusks facing up to possibly be used as further supports), and the walls by putting into the ground vertically shoulder blades, pelvises, long bones, jaws, and the spine. Long bones were often used as poles, commonly placed on the end of another long bone or in the cavity of where tusk used to be. Foundation may have extended as far as 40 cm (16 in) underground. Generally, multiple huts were built in a locality, placed 1–20 m (3–70 ft) apart depending on location. Tusks may have been used to make entrances, skins pulled over for roofing, and the interior sealed up by loess dug out of pits. Some architectural decisions seem to have been purely for aesthetics, best seen in the 4 Epi-Gravettian huts from Mezhyrich, Mezine, Ukraine, where jaws were stacked to create a chevron or zigzag pattern in 2 huts, and long bones were stacked to create horizontal or vertical lines in respectively 1 and 2 huts. The chevron was a commonly used symbol on the Russian Plain, painted or engraved on bones, tools, figurines, and mammoth skulls.

==== Dogs ====
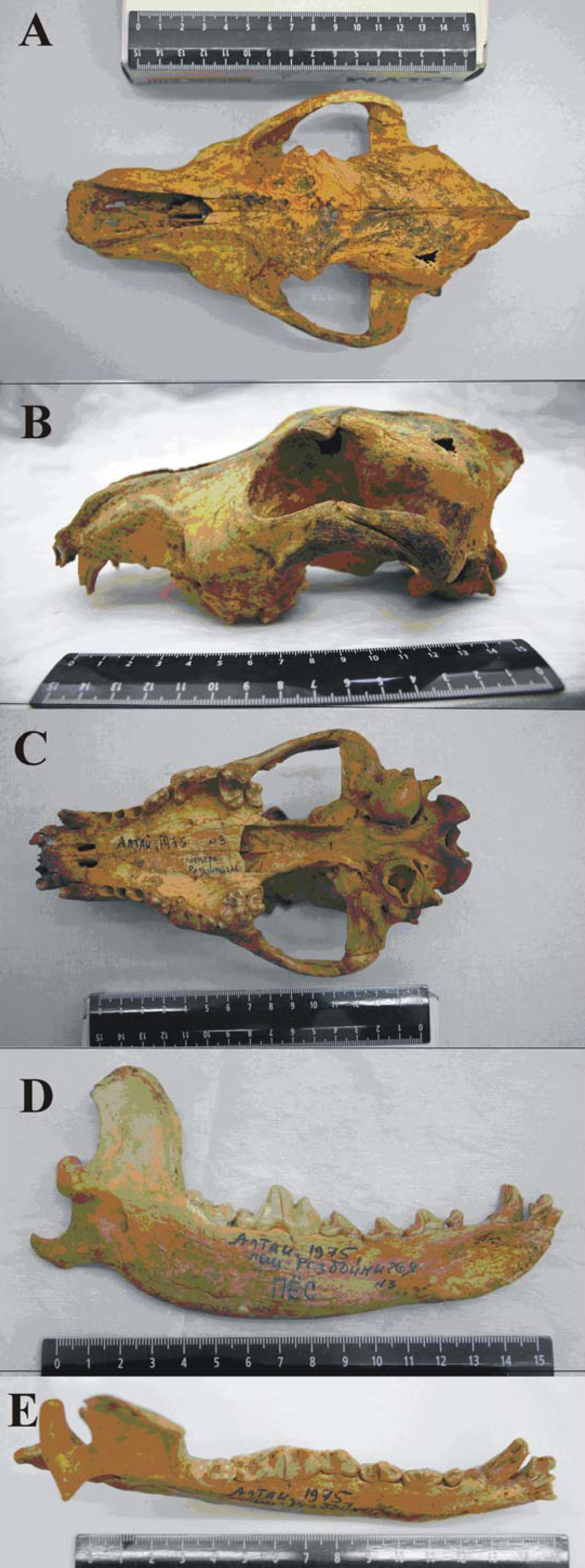
Skull of the 33,000-year-old Altai dog from Siberia; it is not ancestral to any modern dog.

At some point in time, Cro-Magnons domesticated the dog, probably as a result of a symbiotic hunting relationship. DNA evidence suggests that present-day dogs split from wolves around the beginning of the LGM. However, potential Palaeolithic dogs have been found preceding this—namely the 36,000-year-old Goyet dog from Belgium and the 33,000-year-old Altai dog from Siberia—which could indicate there were multiple attempts at domesticating European wolves. These "dogs" had a wide size range, from over 60 cm (2 ft) in height in eastern Europe to less than 30–45 cm (1 ft–1 ft 6 in) in central and western Europe, and 32–41 kg (71–90 lb) in all of Europe. These "dogs" are identified by having a shorter snout and skull, and wider palate and braincase than contemporary wolves. Nonetheless, an Aurignacian origin for domestication is controversial.

At the 24,000 to 27,000 year old Předmostí site, Czech Republic, 3 "dogs" were identified with their skulls perforated (probably to extract the brain), and 1 had a mammoth bone in its mouth. The discoverers interpreted this as a burial ritual. The 14,500-year-old Bonn-Oberkassel dog from Germany was found buried alongside a 40-year-old man and a 25-year-old woman, as well as traces of red hematite, and is genetically placed as an ancestor to present-day dogs. It was diagnosed with canine distemper virus and probably died between 19 and 23 weeks of age. It would have required extensive human care to survive without being able to contribute anything, suggesting that, at this point, humans and dogs were connected by emotional or symbolic ties rather than purely materialistic personal gain.

The exact utility of these proto-dogs is unclear, but they may have played a vital role in hunting, as well as domestic services such as transporting items or guarding camp or carcasses.

=== Art ===
When examples of Upper Palaeolithic art were first discovered in the 19th century in the form of engraved objects, they were assumed to have been "art for art's sake" as Palaeolithic peoples were widely conceived as having been uncultured savages. This model was primarily championed by French archaeologist Louis Laurent Gabriel de Mortillet. Then, detailed paintings found deep within caves were discovered, the first being Cueva de Altamira, Spain, in 1879. The "art for art's sake" model came apart by the turn of the century as more examples of cave art were found in hard-to-reach places in western Europe such as Combarelles and Font-de-Gaume, for which the idea of it being simply a leisure activity became increasingly untenable.

==== Cave art ====
Cro-Magnons are well known for having painted or engraved geometric designs, hand stencils, plants, animals, and seemingly human/animal hybrid creatures on cave walls deep inside caves. Typically the same species are represented in caves which have such art, but the total number of species is quite numerous, and namely includes creatures such as mammoths, bison, lions, bears, and ibex. Nonetheless, some caves were dominated by certain forms, such as Grotte de Niaux where over half of the animals are bison. Images could be drawn on top of one another. Landscapes were never depicted, with the exception of a supposed depiction of a volcanic eruption at Chauvet-Pont d'Arc, France, dating to 36,000 years ago. Cave art is found in dark cave recesses, and the artists either lit a fire on the cave floor or used portable stone lamps to see. Drawing materials include black charcoal and red and yellow ochre crayons, but they, along with a variety of other minerals, could also be ground into powder and mixed with water to create paint. Large, flat rocks may have been used as palettes, and brushes may have included reeds, bristles, and twigs, and possibly a blowgun was used to spray paint over less accessible areas. Hand stencils could either be made by holding the hand to the wall and spitting paint over it (leaving a negative image) or by applying paint to the hand and then sticking it to the wall. Some hand stencils are missing fingers, but it is unclear if the artist was actually missing the finger or simply excluded it from the stencil. It has generally been assumed that the larger prints were left by men and the smaller ones by boys, but the exclusion of women entirely may be improbable. Though many hypotheses have been proposed for the symbolism of cave art, it is still debated why these works were created in the first place.

One of the first hypotheses regarding their symbolism was forwarded by French religious historian Salomon Reinach who supposed that, because only animals were depicted on cave walls, the images represented totem veneration, in which a group or a group member identifies with a certain animal associated with certain powers, and honours or respects this animal in some way such as by not hunting it. If this were the case, then Cro-Magnons communities within a region would have subdivided themselves into, for example, a "horse clan", a "bison clan", a "lion clan", and so forth. This was soon contested as some caves contain depictions of animals wounded by projectiles, and generally multiple species are represented.

In 1903, Reinach proposed that the cave art represented sympathetic magic (between the painting and the painting's subject), and by drawing an animal doing some kind of action, the artist believed they were exerting that same action onto the animal. That is, by being the master of the image, they could master the animal itself. The hunting magic model—and the idea that art was magical and utilitarian in Cro-Magnons society—gained much popularity in the following decades. In this model, herbivorous prey items were depicted as having been wounded prior to a hunt in order to cast a spell over them; some animals were incompletely depicted to enfeeble them; geometric designs were traps; and human/animal hybrids were sorcerers dressed as animals to gain their power, or were gods ruling over the animals. Many animals were depicted as completely healthy and intact, and sometimes pregnant, which this model interprets as fertility magic to promote reproduction; however, if the animal was a carnivore, then this model says that the depiction served to destroy the animal. By the mid-20th century, this model was being contested because of how few depictions of wounded animals exist; the collection of consumed animal bones in decorated caves often did not match types of animals depicted in terms of abundance; and the magic model does not explain hand stencils.

Following the 1960s, begun by German-American art historian Max Raphael, the study of cave art took on a much more statistical approach, analysing and quantifying items such as the types and distribution of animals depicted, cave topography, and cave wall morphology. Based on such structuralist tests, horses and bovines seem to have been preferentially clustered together typically in a central position, and such binary organisation led to the suggestion that this was sexual symbolism, and some animals and iconography were designated by Cro-Magnons as either male or female. This conclusion has been heavily contested as well, due to the subjective definition of association between two different animals, and the great detail the animals were depicted in, permitting sexual identification (and further, the hypothesis that bison were supposed to be feminine contradicts the finding that many are male).

Also in the late 20th century, with the popularisation of the hypothesis that Cro-Magnons practised shamanism, the human/animal hybrids and geometrical symbols were interpreted within this framework as the visions a shaman would see while in a trance (entoptic phenomena). Opponents mainly attack the comparisons made between Palaeolithic cultures and present-day shamanistic societies for being in some way inaccurate. In 1988, archaeologists David Lewis-Williams and Thomas Dowson suggested trances were induced by hallucinogenic plants containing either mescaline, LSD, or psilocybin; but there is no evidence Cro-Magnons purposefully ate them.

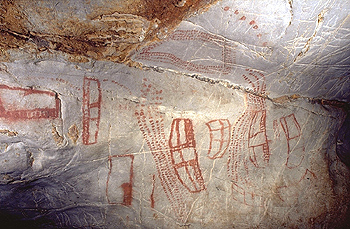
Proto-Aurignacian dots and lines from Cueva del Castillo, Spain

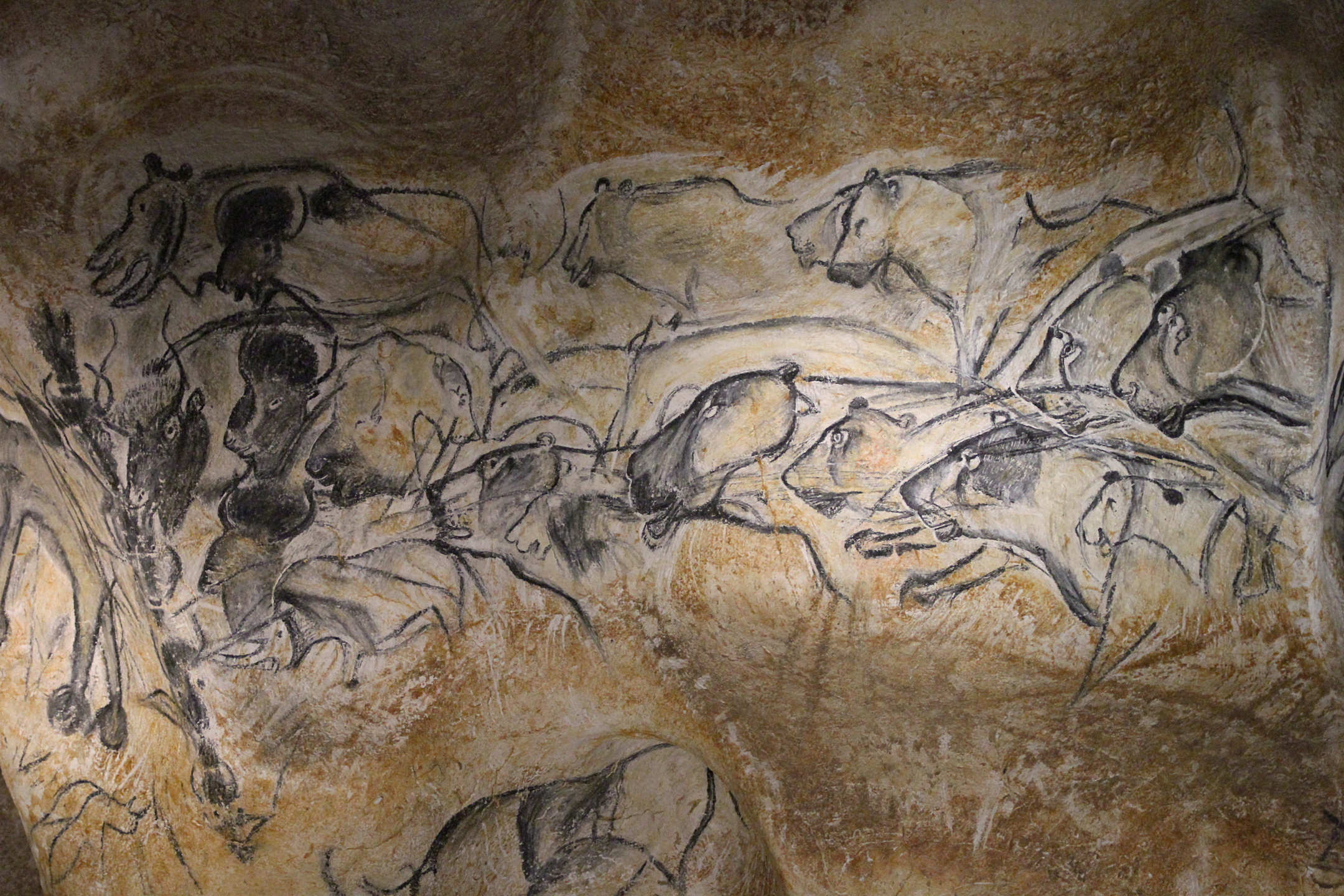
Aurignacian lions, rhinos, and bison at Chauvet Cave, France

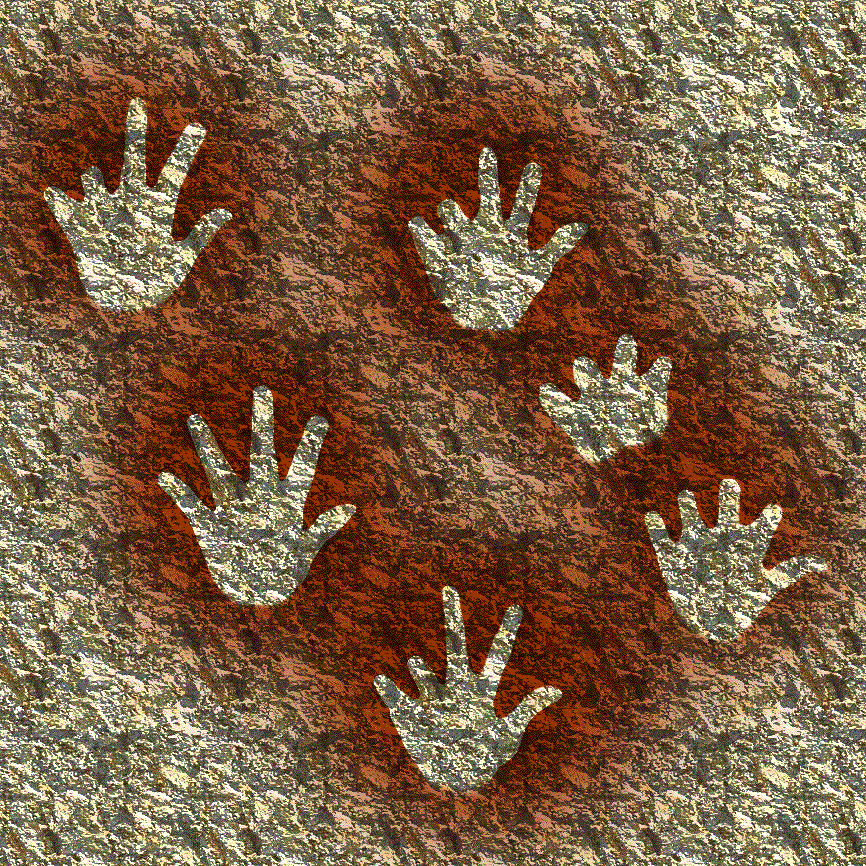
Gravettian hand stencils from Grottes de Gargas, France

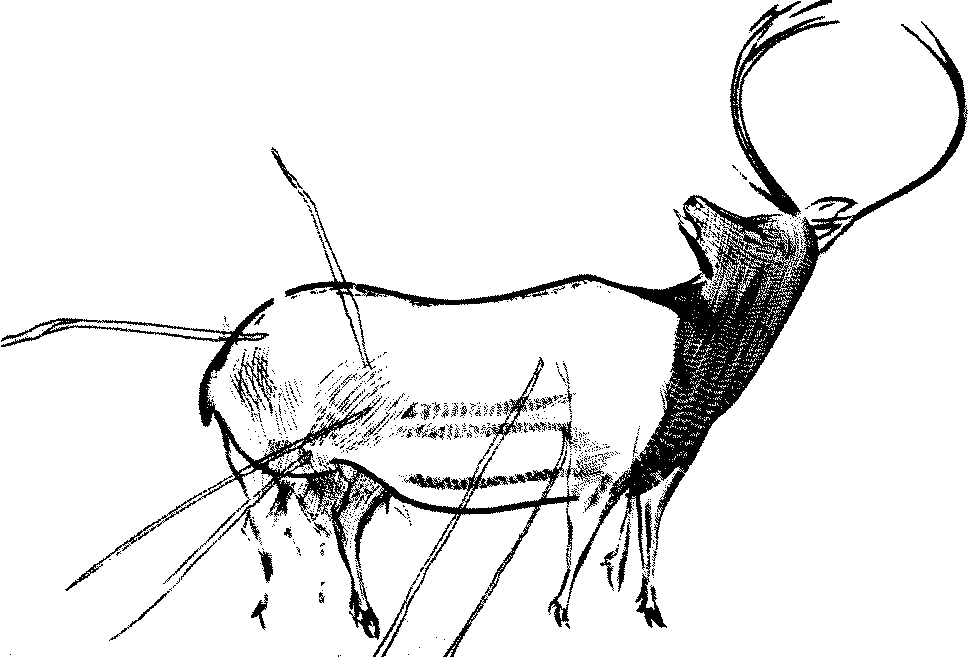
Solutrean wounded deer from Peña de Candamo, Spain

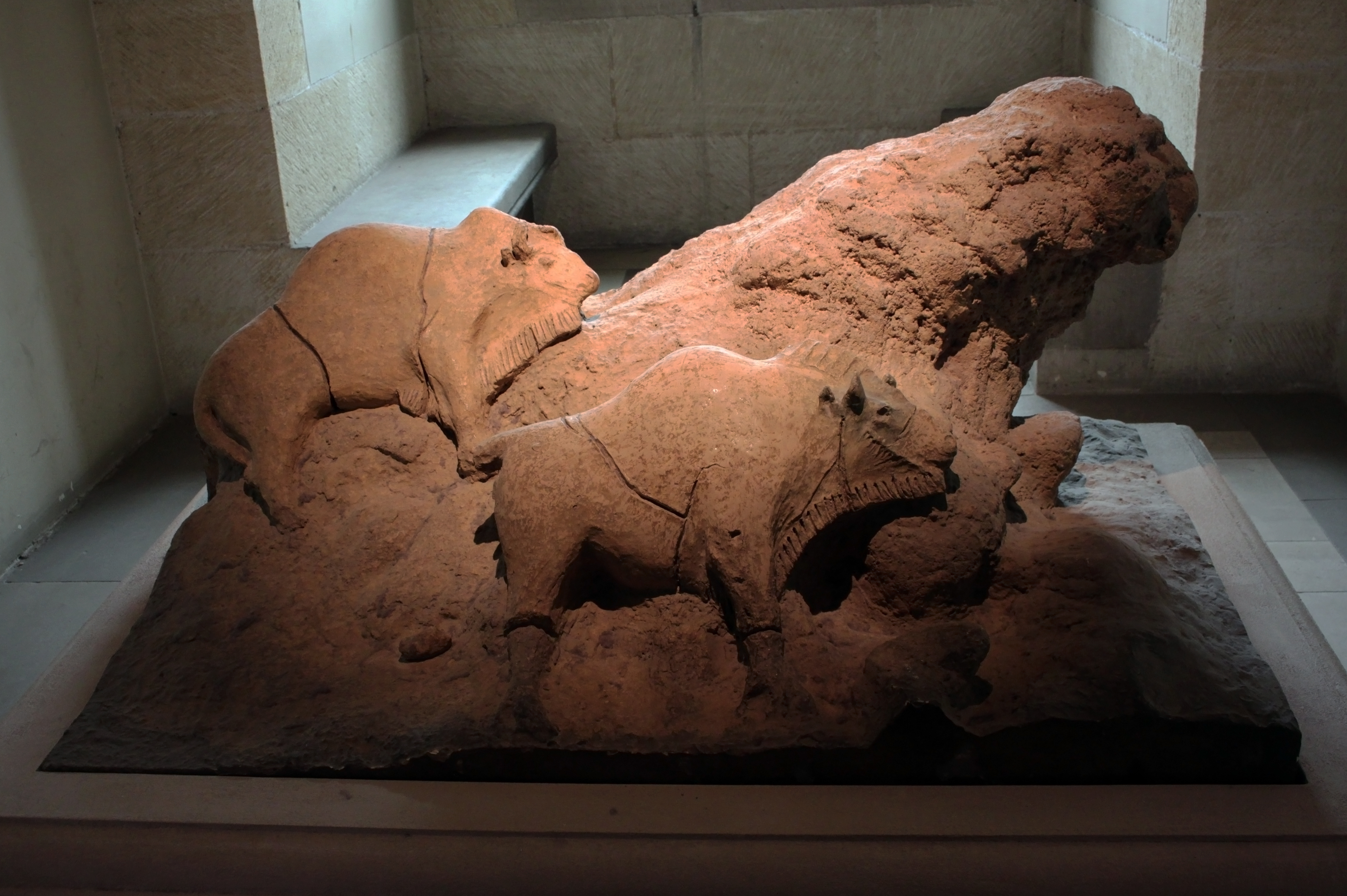
Magdalenian bison clay sculptures at Tuc d'Audoubert, France

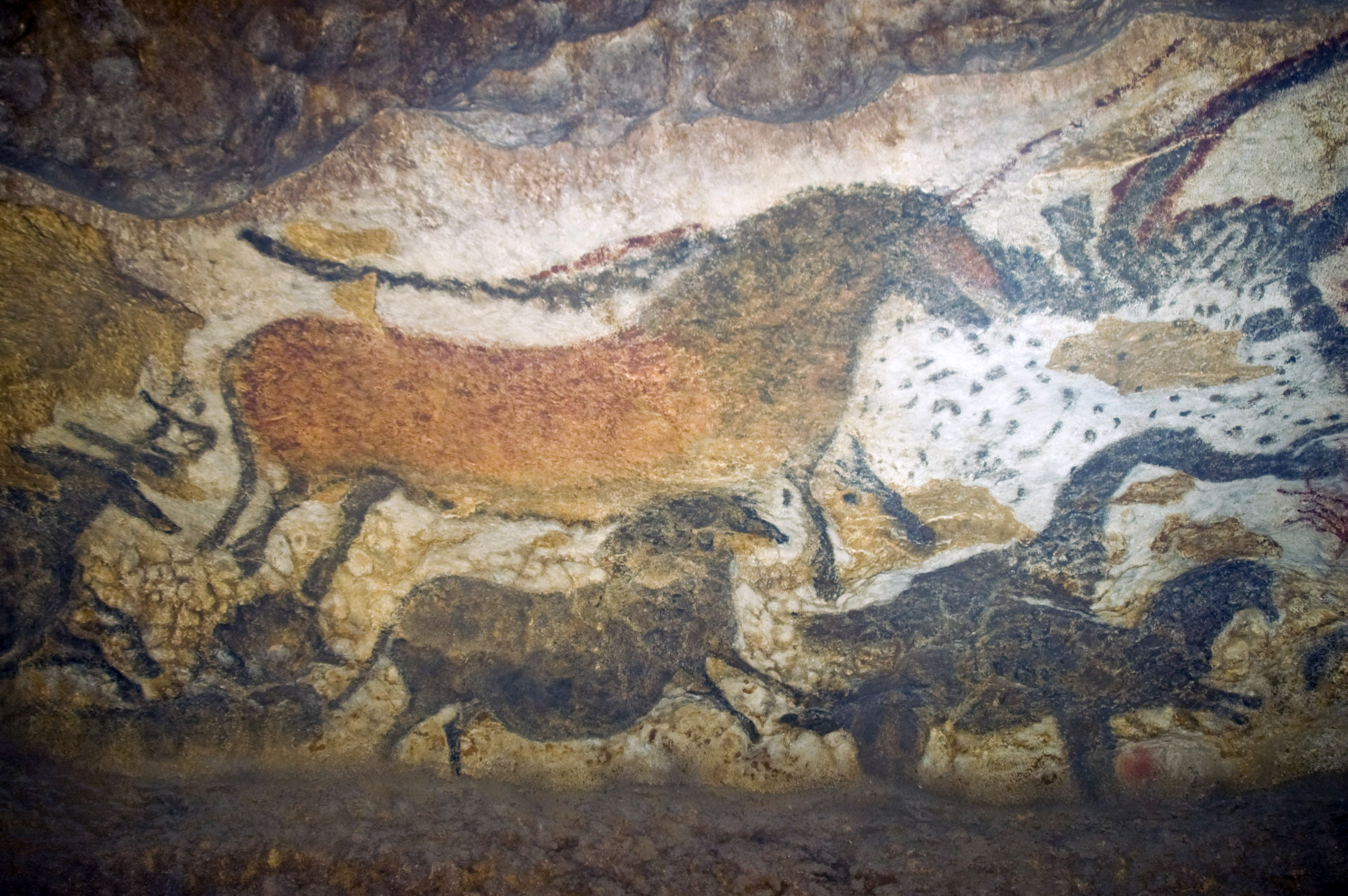
Magdalenian horses at Lascaux, France

==== Portable art ====
Venus figurines are commonly found associated with Cro-Magnons and are the earliest well-acknowledged representation of human figures. These are most frequently found in the Gravettian (notably in the French Upper Périgordian, the Czech Pavlovian, and West Russian Kostenkian) most dating from 23,000 to 29,000 years ago. Almost all Venuses depict naked women, and are generally hand-held sized. They feature a downturned head, no face, thin arms which end at or cross over voluminous breasts, rotund buttocks, a distended abdomen (interpreted as pregnancy), tiny and bent legs, and pegged or unnaturally short feet. Venuses vary in proportions which may represent limitations using certain materials over others, or intentional design choices. Eastern European Venuses seem to have more of an emphasis on the breasts and stomach, whereas western European ones emphasise the hips and thighs.

The earliest interpretations of the Venuses believed these were literal representations of women with obesity or steatopygia (a condition where a woman's body stores more fat in the thighs and buttocks, making them especially prominent). Another early hypothesis was that ideal womanhood for Cro-Magnons involved obesity, or that the Venuses were used by men as erotica due to the exaggeration of body parts typically sexualised in Western culture (as well as the lack of detail to individualising traits such as the face and limbs). Extending present-day Western norms to Palaeolithic peoples was contested, and a counter interpretation is that either Venuses were mother goddesses, or that Cro-Magnons believed depictions of things had magical properties over the subject, and that such a depiction of a pregnant woman would facilitate fertility and fecundity. This is also contested as it assumes women are only thought of in terms of child rearing.

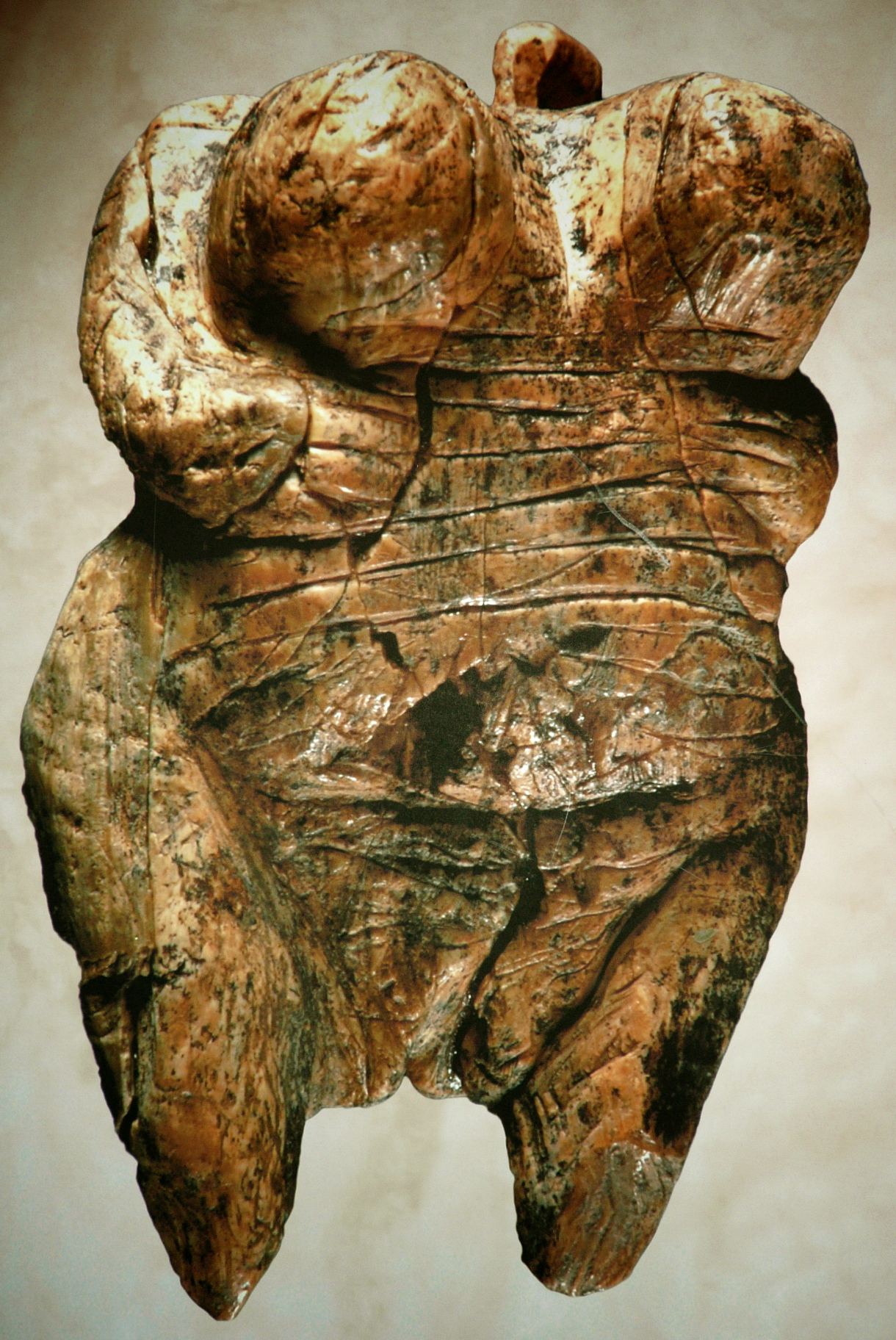
35,000-year-old Venus of Hohle Fels from Germany

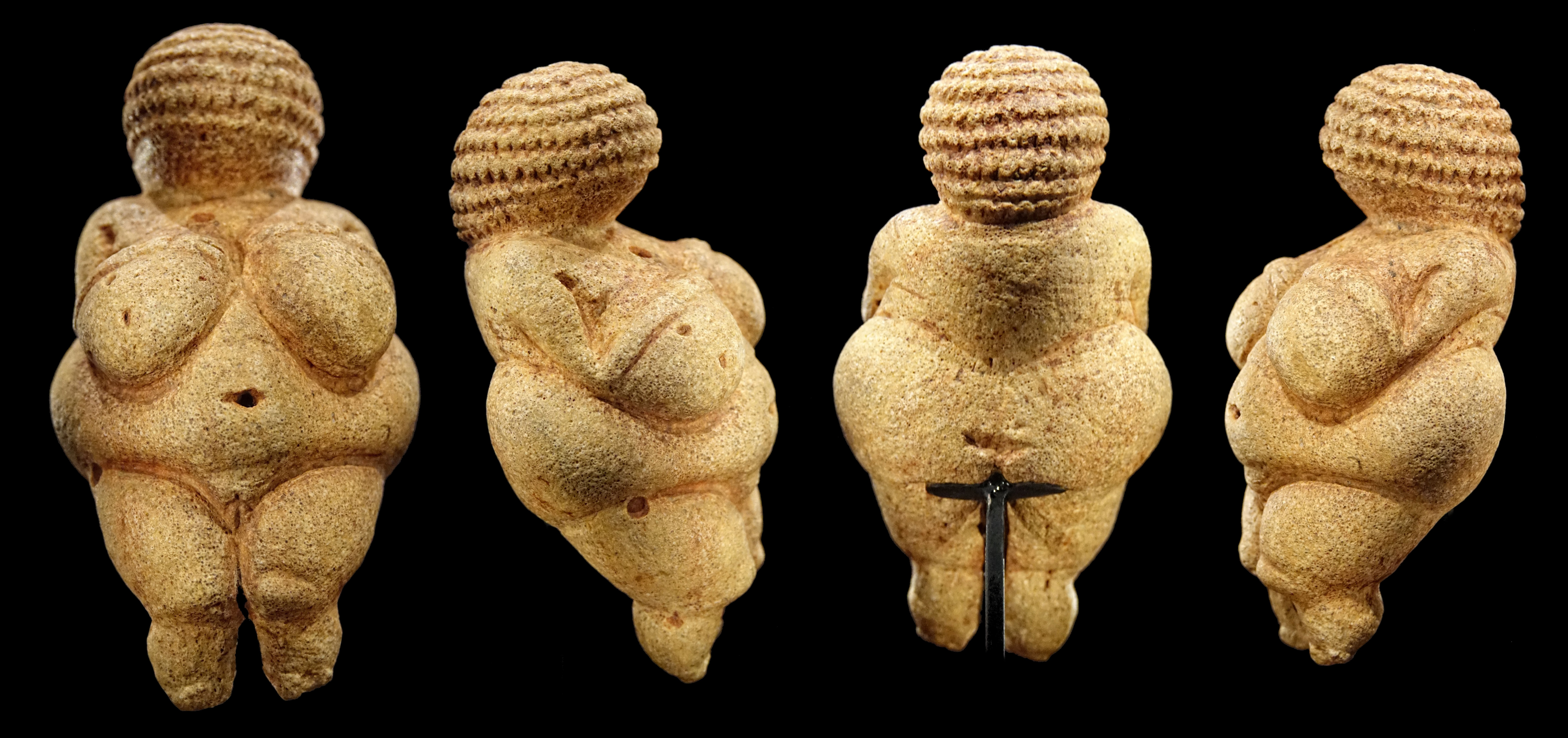
30,000-year-old Venus of Willendorf from Austria

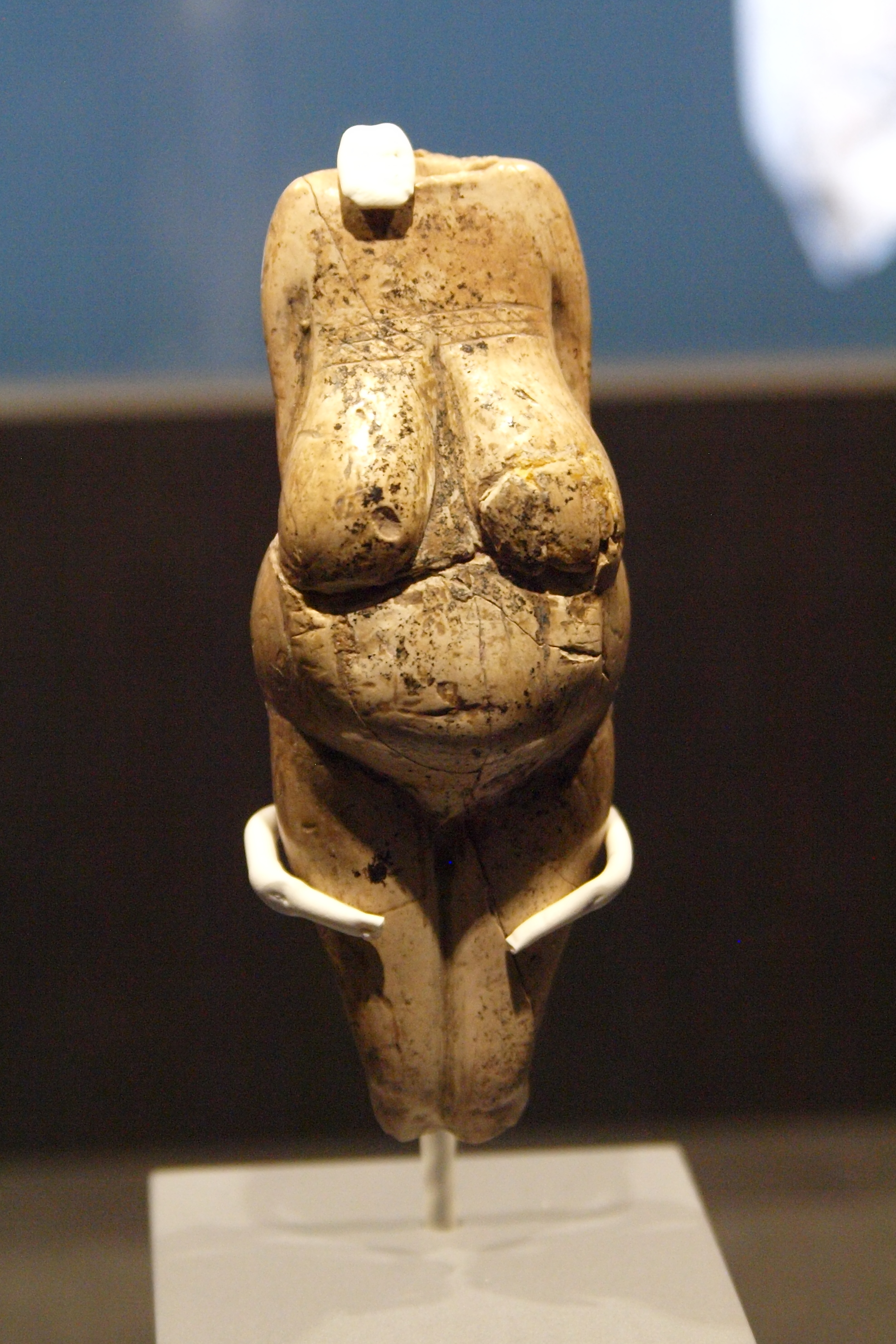
25,000-year-old Venus from Kostenki, Russia

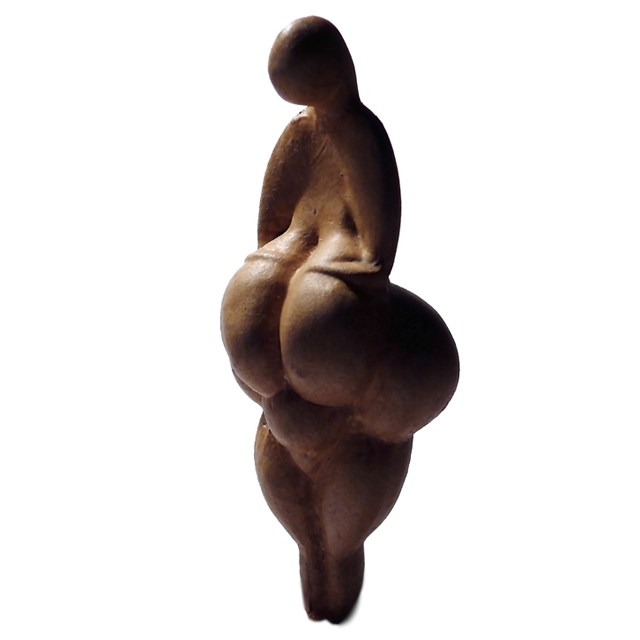
25,000-year-old Venus of Lespugue from France

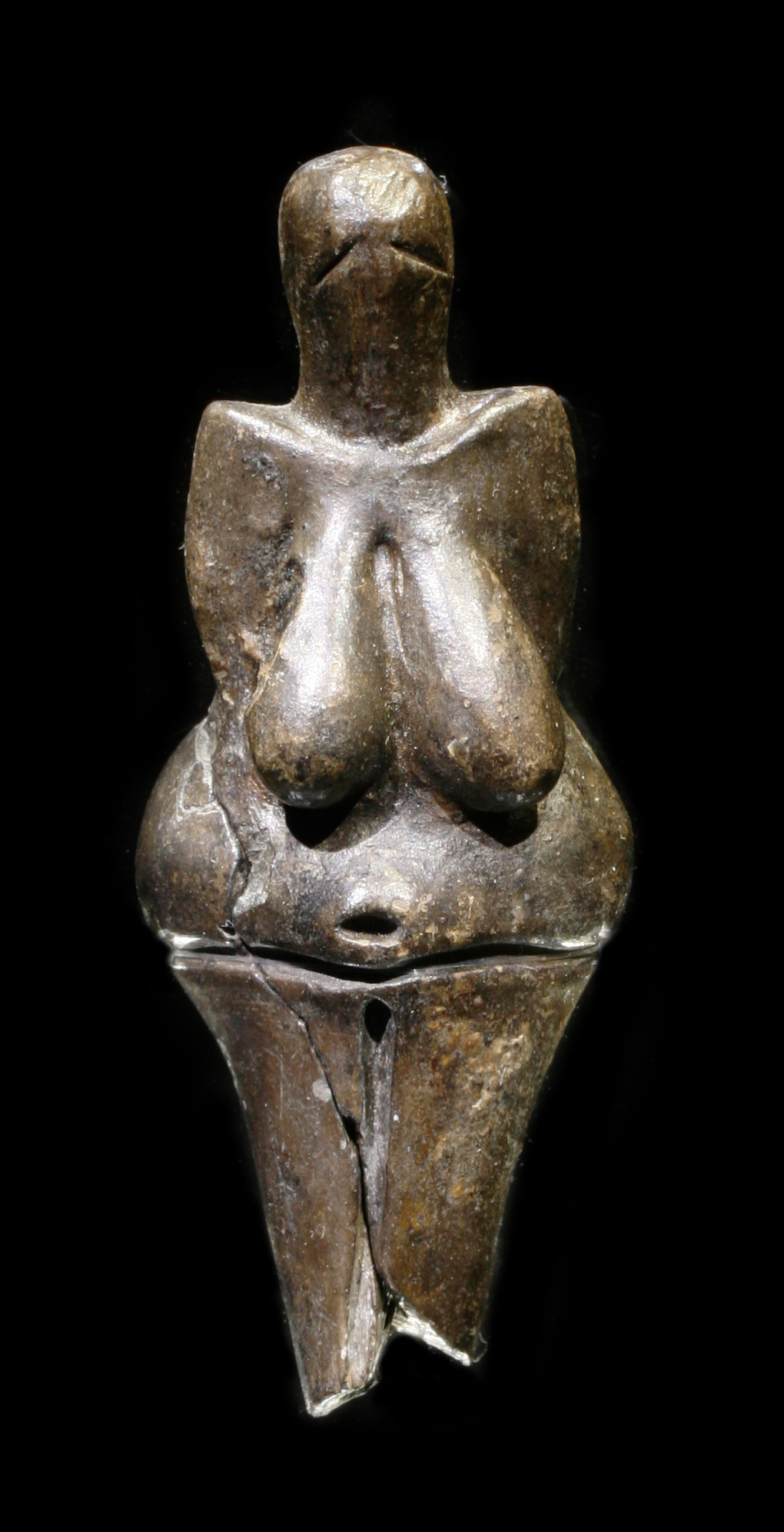
Gravettian Venus of Dolní Věstonice from Czech Republic

Cro-Magnons also carved perforated batons out of horn, bone, or stone, most commonly through the Solutrean and Magdalenian. Such batons disappear from the archaeological record at the Magdalenian's close. Some batons seem phallic in nature. By 2010, about 60 batons had been hypothesised to be representations of penises (all with erections), of which 30 show decoration, and 23 are perforated. Several phallic batons are depicted as circumcised and seemingly bearing some ornamentation such as piercings, scarification, or tattooing. The purpose of perforated batons has been debated, which suggestions for spiritual or religious purposes, ornamentation or status symbol, currency, drumsticks, tent holders, weaving tools, spear straighteners, spear throwers, or dildos. Unperforated phallic batons, measuring just a few centimetres long to up to 30 cm (12 in), were interpreted as sex toys quite early on.

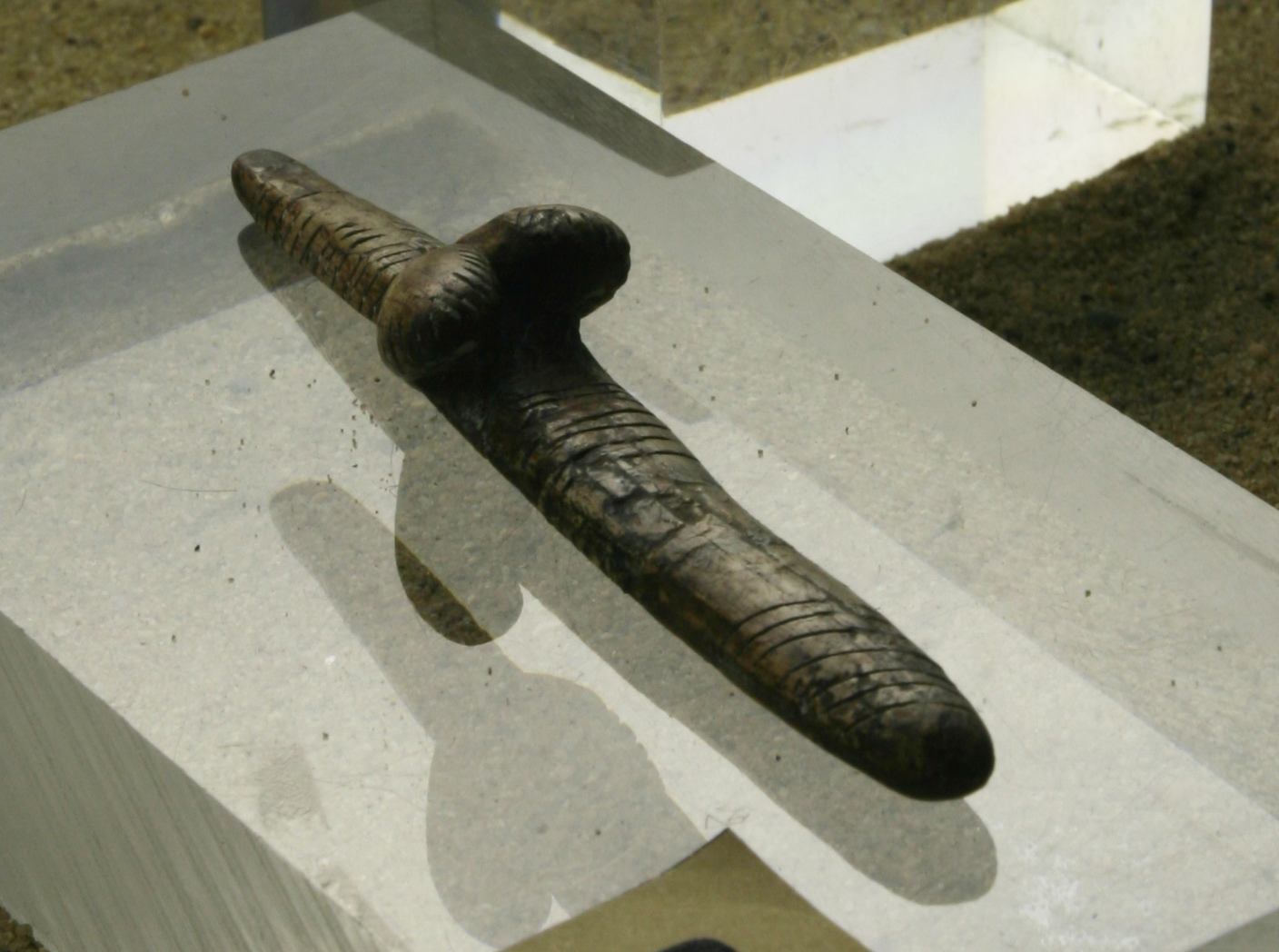
Phallus from Czech Republic

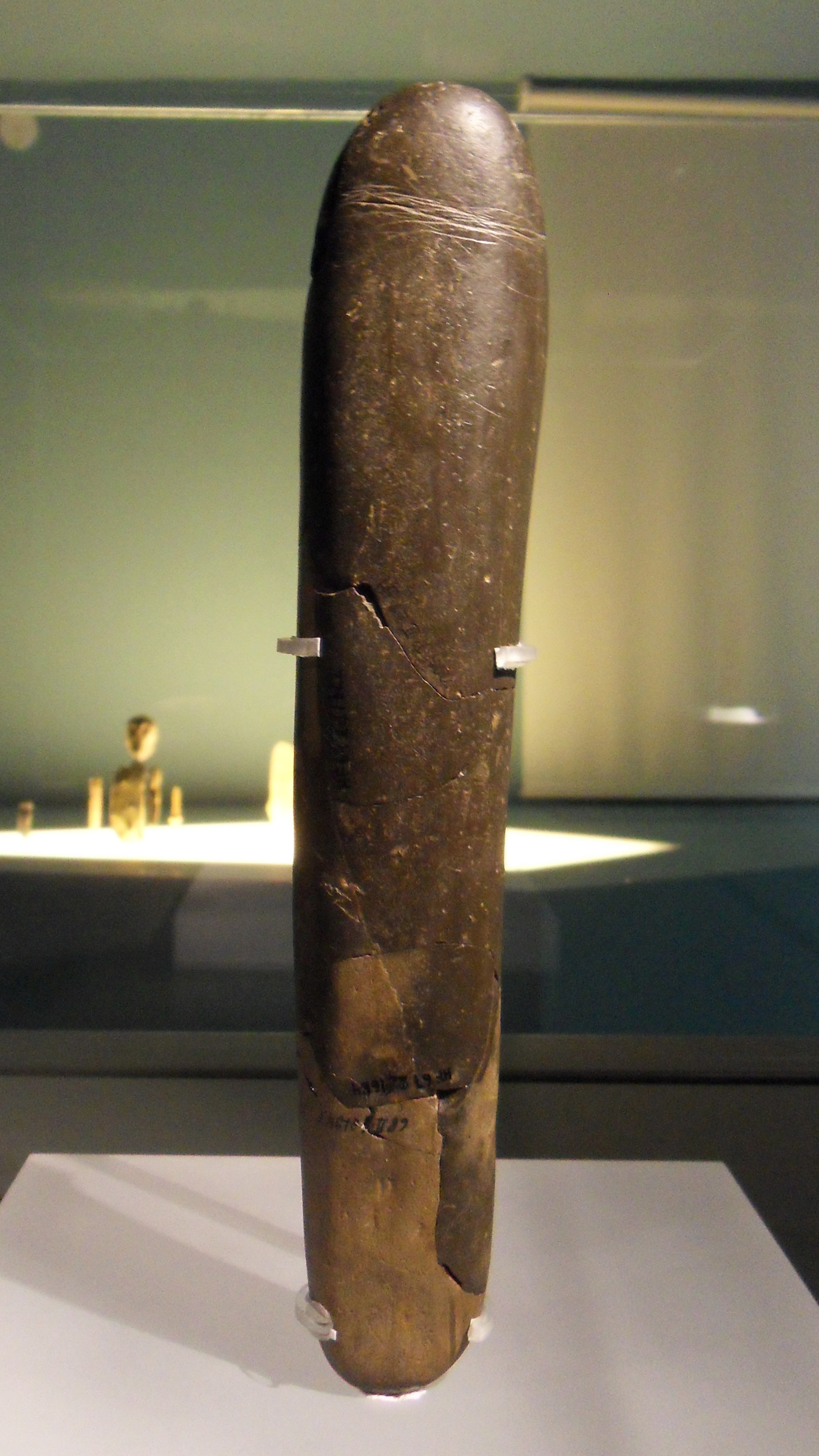
Aurignacian phallus from Hohle Fels, Germany

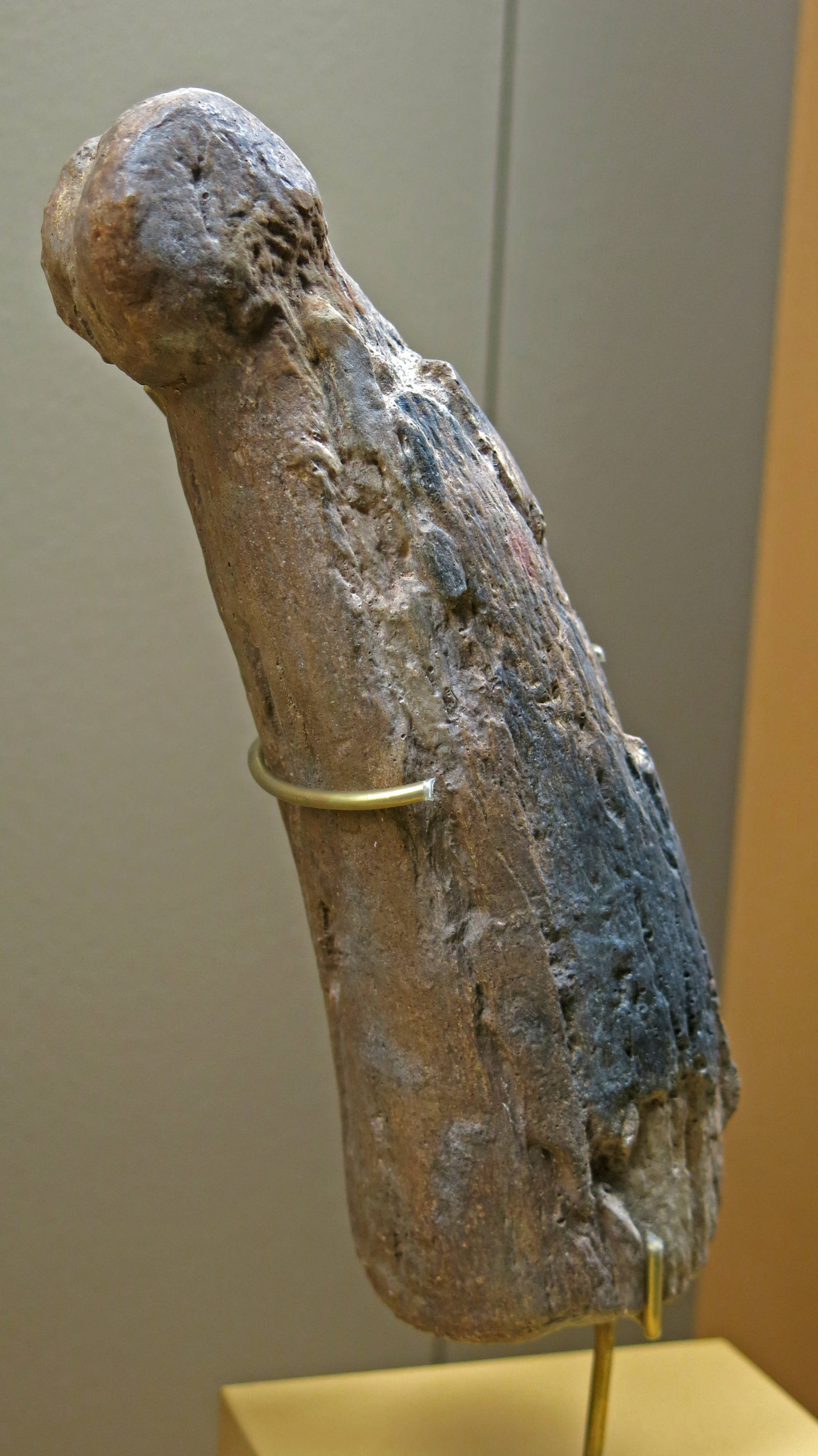
Aurignacian phallus from Castel Merle, France

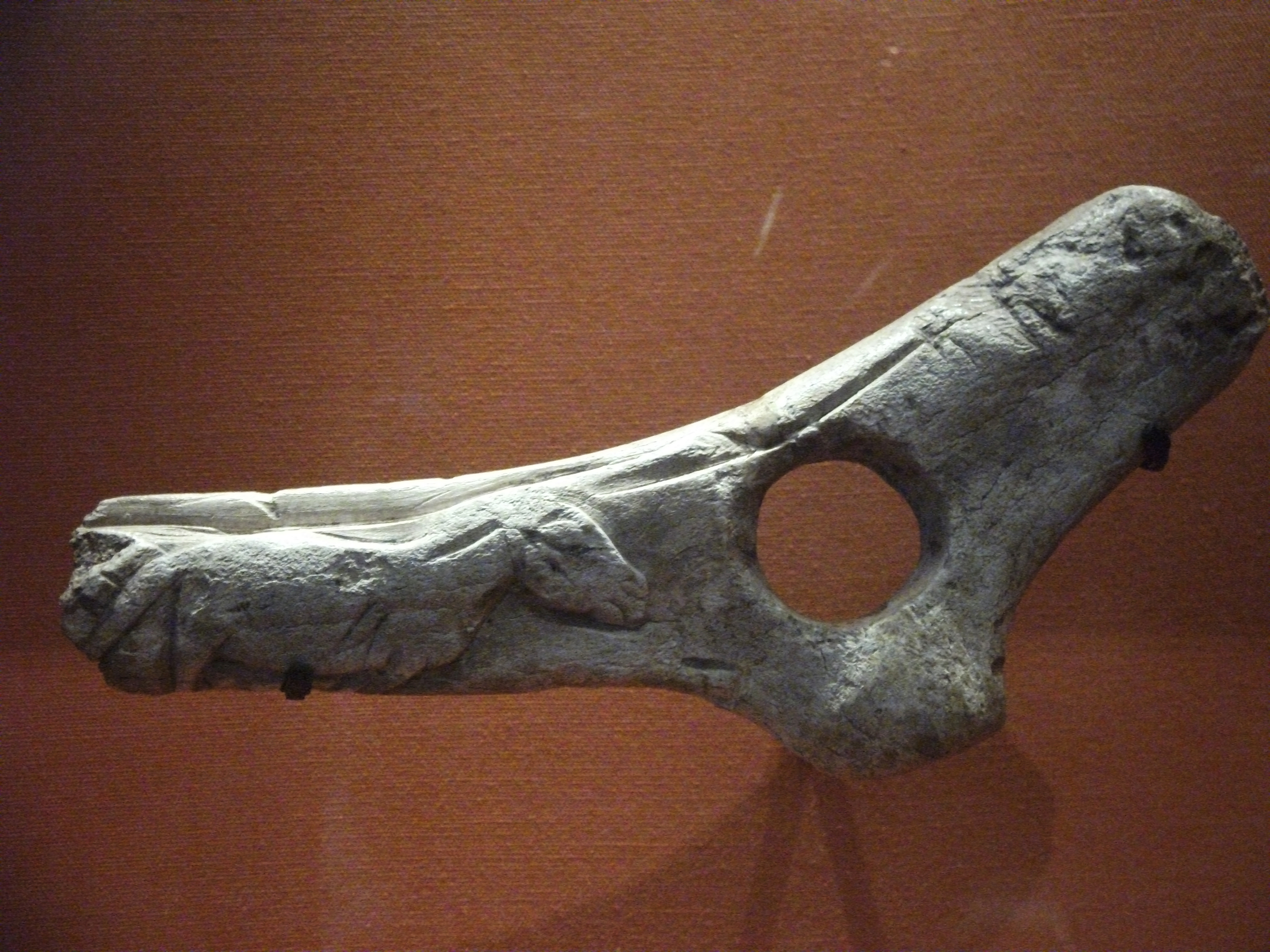
Magdalenian perforated baton with a horse relief from L'Abri de la Madeleine, France

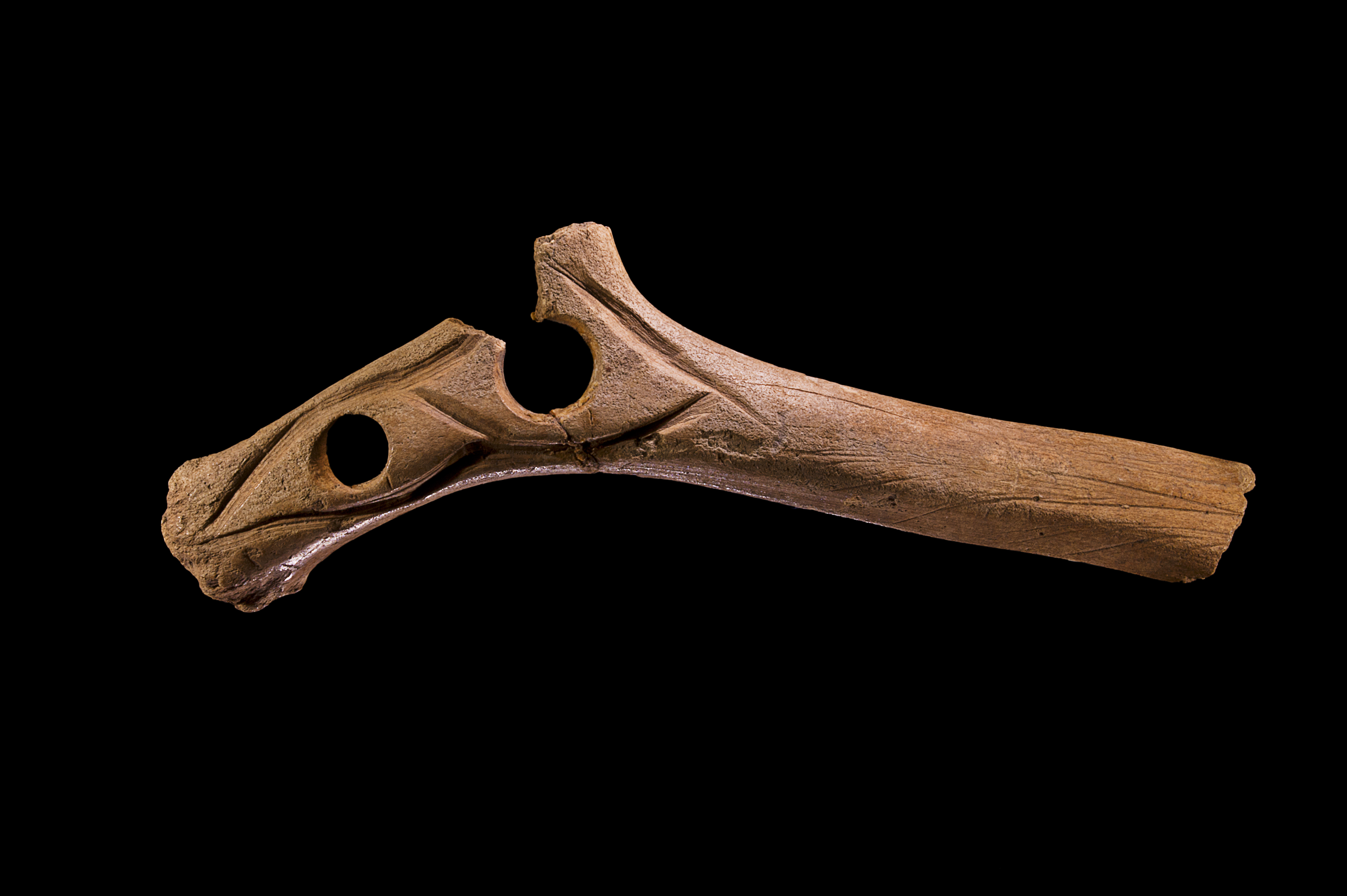
Magdalenian perforated baton with an engraving from L'Abri de la Madeleine, France

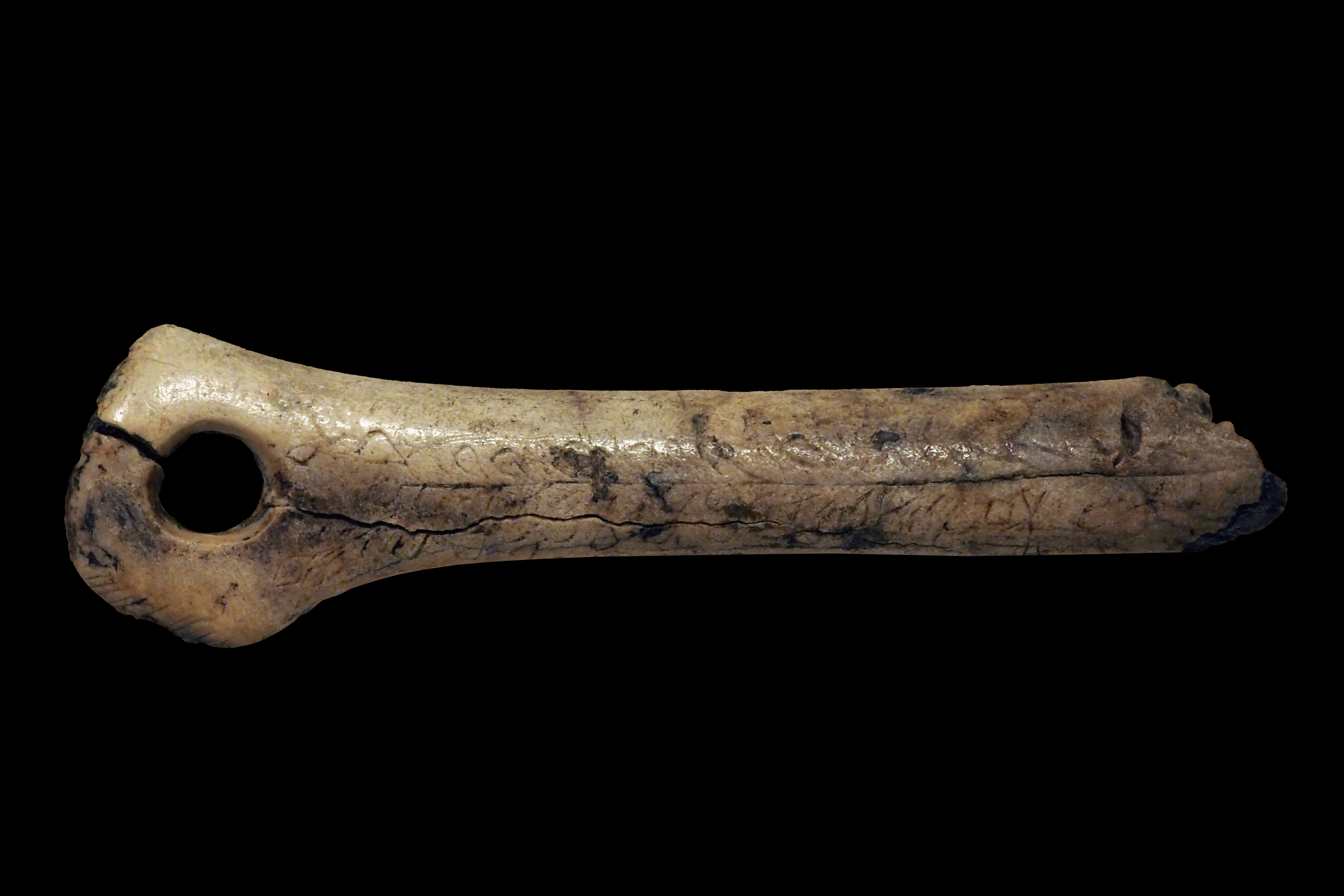
Magdalenian perforated baton from Veyrier, Switzerland

Depictions of animals were commonly produced by Cro-Magnons. As of 2015, as many as 50 Aurignacian ivory figurines and fragments have been recovered from the German Swabian Jura. Of the discernible figures, most represent mammoths and lions, and a few horses, bison, possibly a rhino, waterfowl, fish, and small mammals. These sculptures are hand-sized and would have been portable works, and some figurines were made into wearable pendants. Some figurines also featured enigmatic engravings, dots, marks, lines, hooks, and criss-cross patterns.

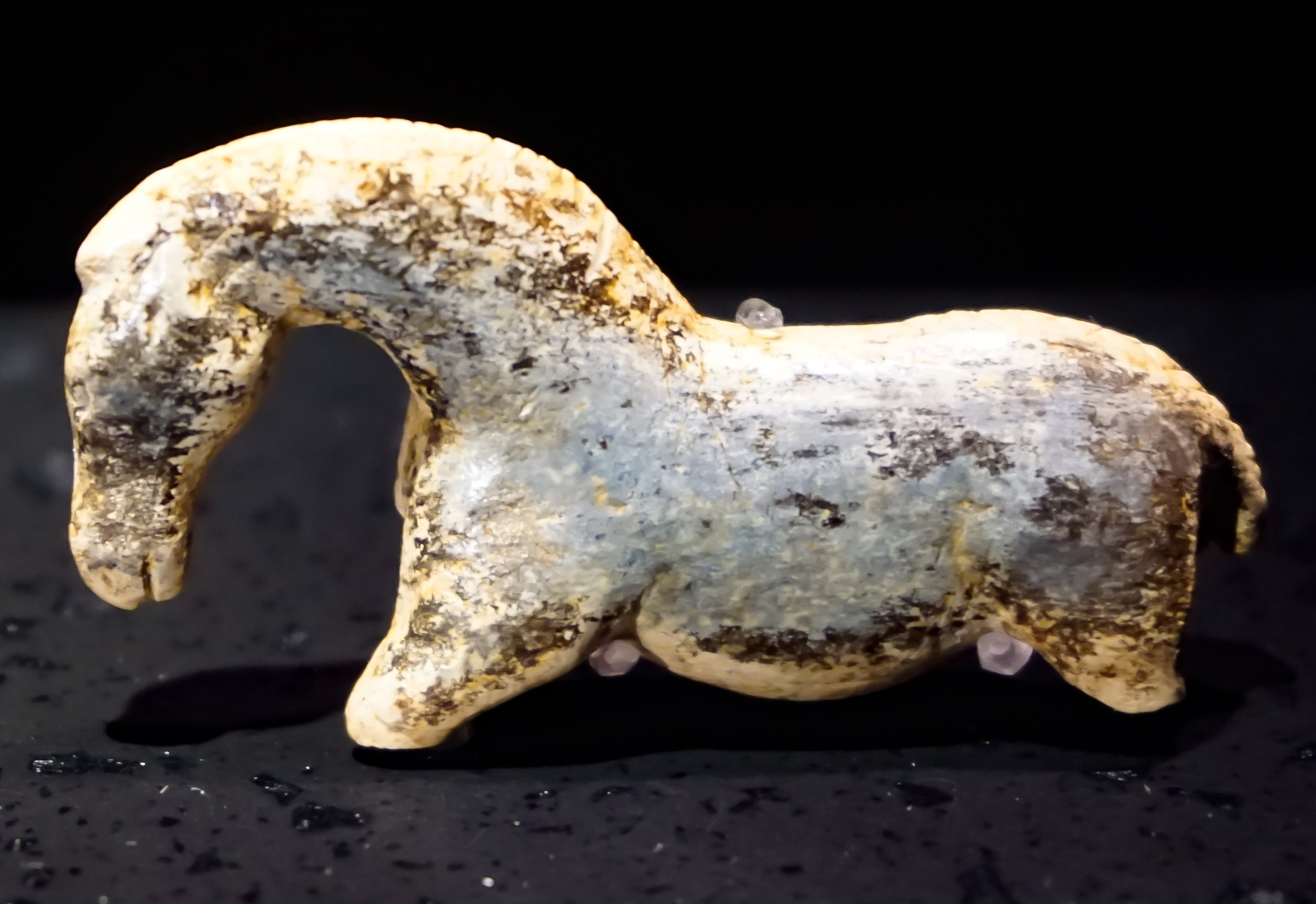
Aurignacian horse sculpture from Vogelherd Cave, Germany

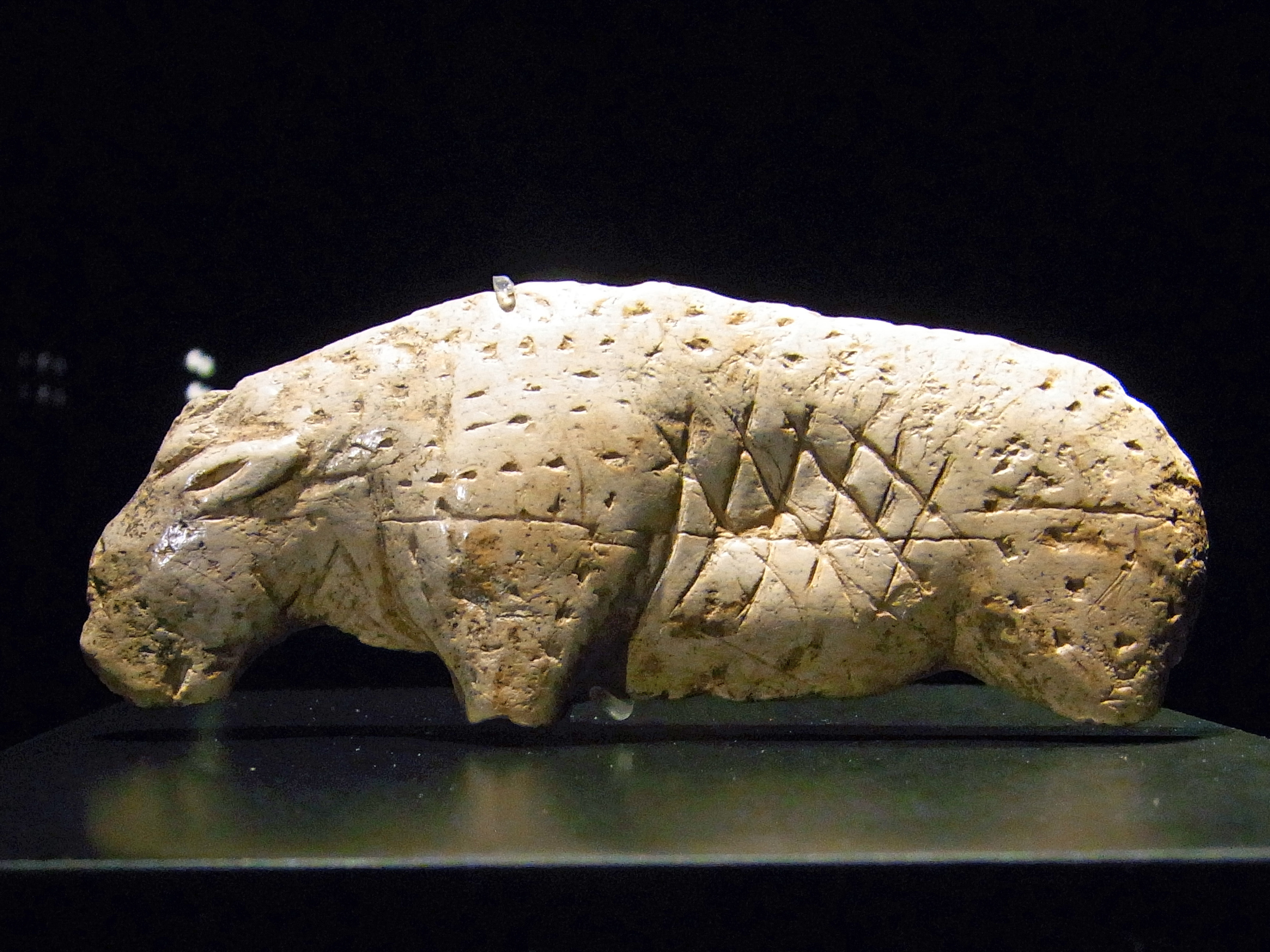
Aurignacian lion sculpture from Vogelherd Cave, Germany

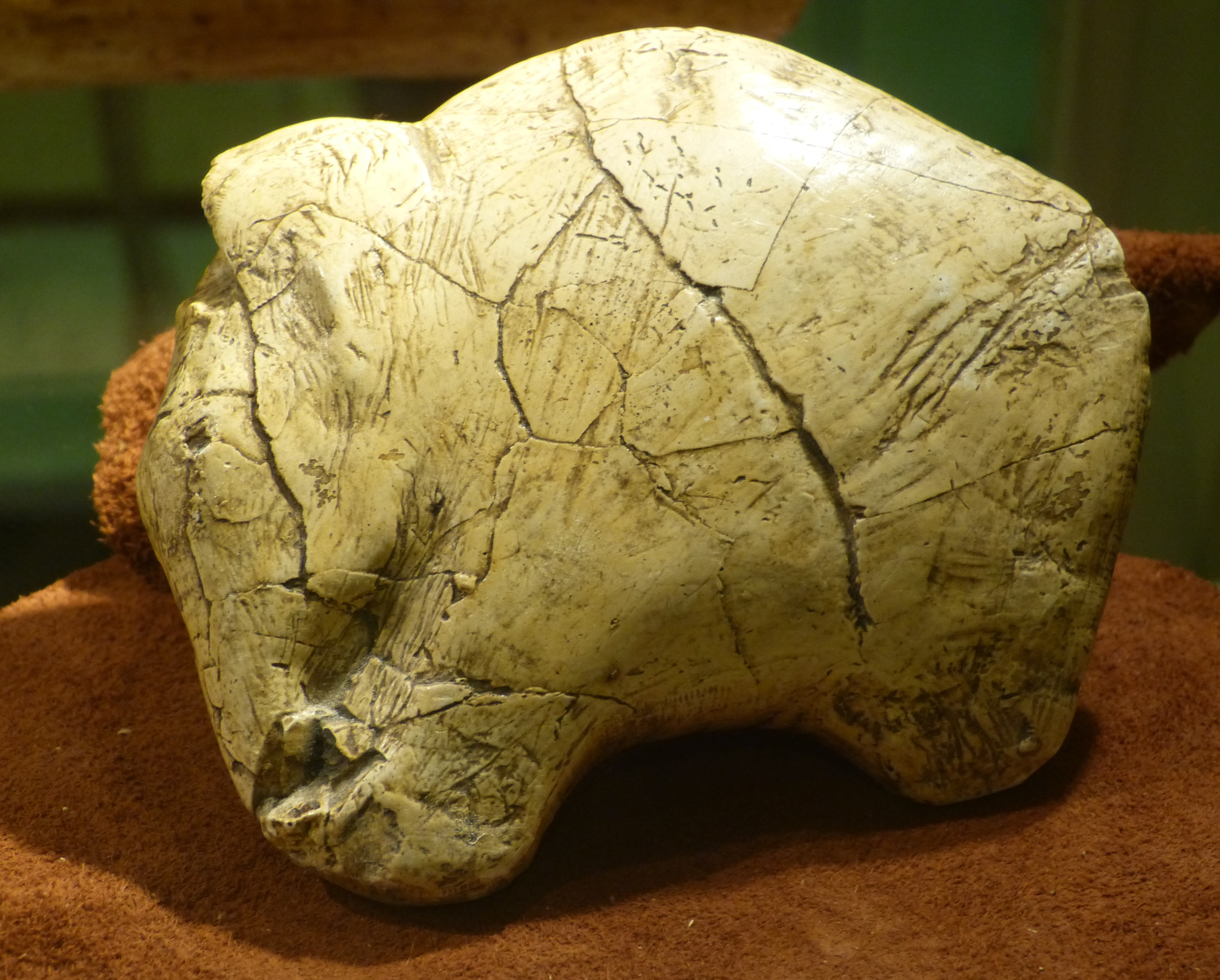
26,000-year-old mammoth carving from Predmosti, Czech Republic

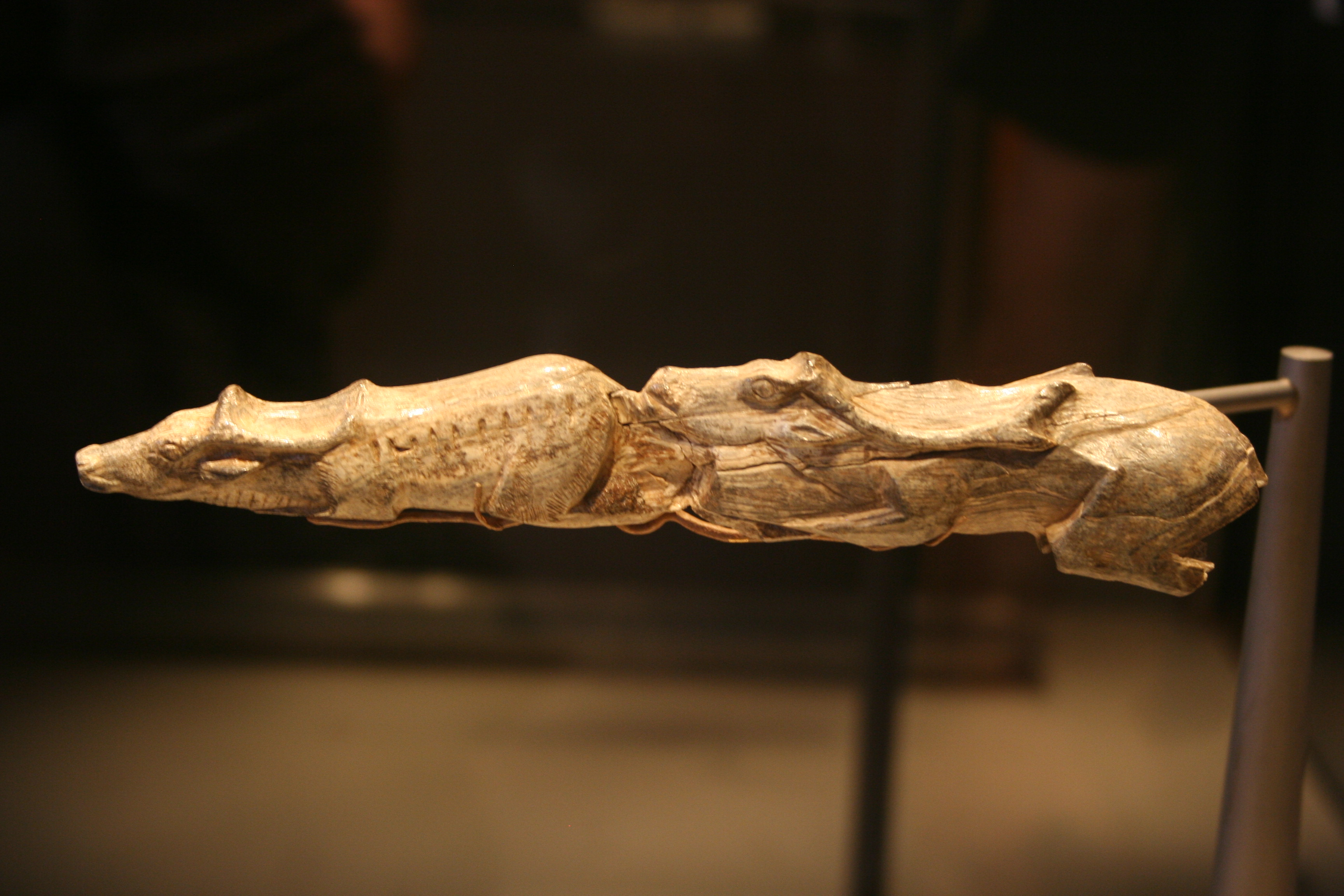
13,000-year-old Swimming Reindeer sculpture from L'Abri Bruniquel, France

Cro-Magnons also made purely symbolic engravings. There are several plaques of bone or antler (referred to as polishers, spatulas, palettes, or knives) which feature series of equidistantly placed notches, most notably the well-preserved 32,000-year-old Blanchard plaque from L'Abri Blanchard, France, which features 24 markings in a seemingly serpentine pattern. The discoverer, British palaeontologist Thomas Rupert Jones, speculated in 1875 this was an early counting system for tallying items such as animals killed, or some other notation system. In 1957, Czech archaeologist Karel Absolon suggested they represent arithmetic. In 1972, Marshack postulated they may be calendars. Also in 1972, Marshack identified 13,000 to 15,000 year old Magdalenian plaques bearing small, abstract symbols seemingly into organised blocks or sets, which he interpreted as representing an early writing system.

Czech archaeologist Bohuslav Klíma speculated a complex engraving on a mammoth tusk he discovered in the Gravettian Pavlov site, Czech Republic, as being a map, showing a meandering river centre-left, a mountain centre-right, and a living grounds at the centre indicated by a double circle. A few similar engravings have been identified across Europe (in particular the Russian Plain), which he also postulated were maps, plans, or stories.

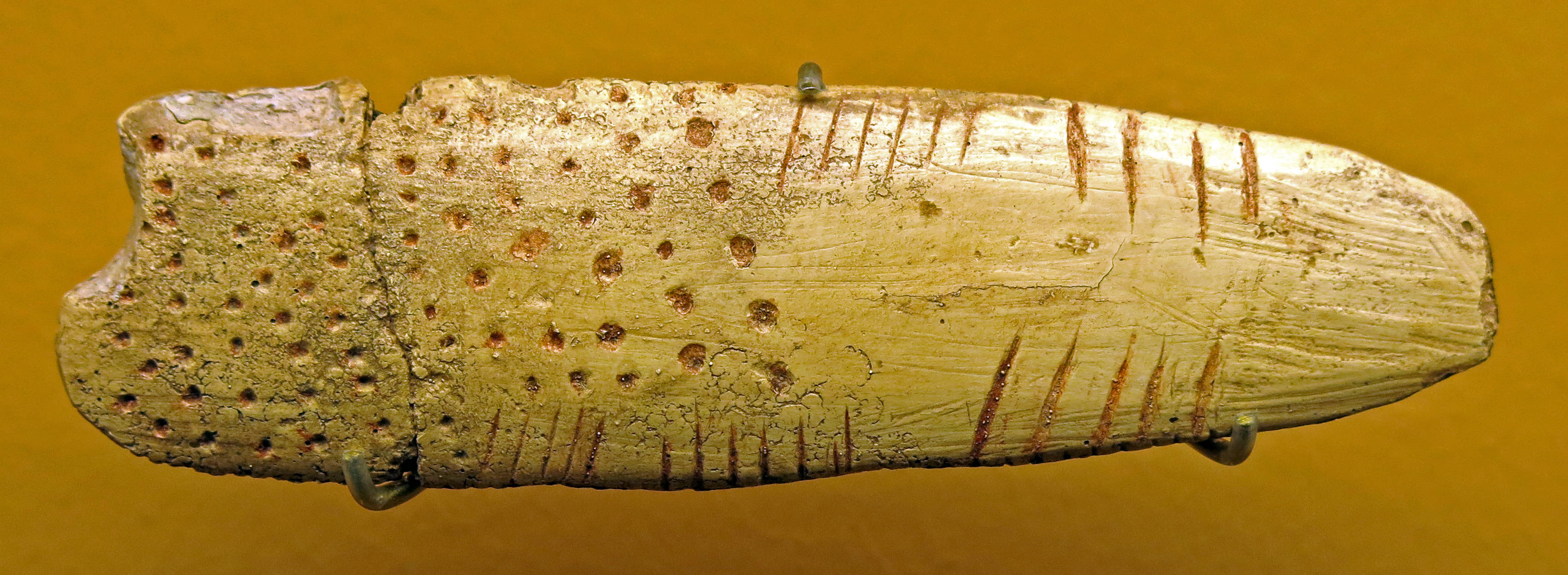
Aurignacian plaque from L'Abri Lartet, France

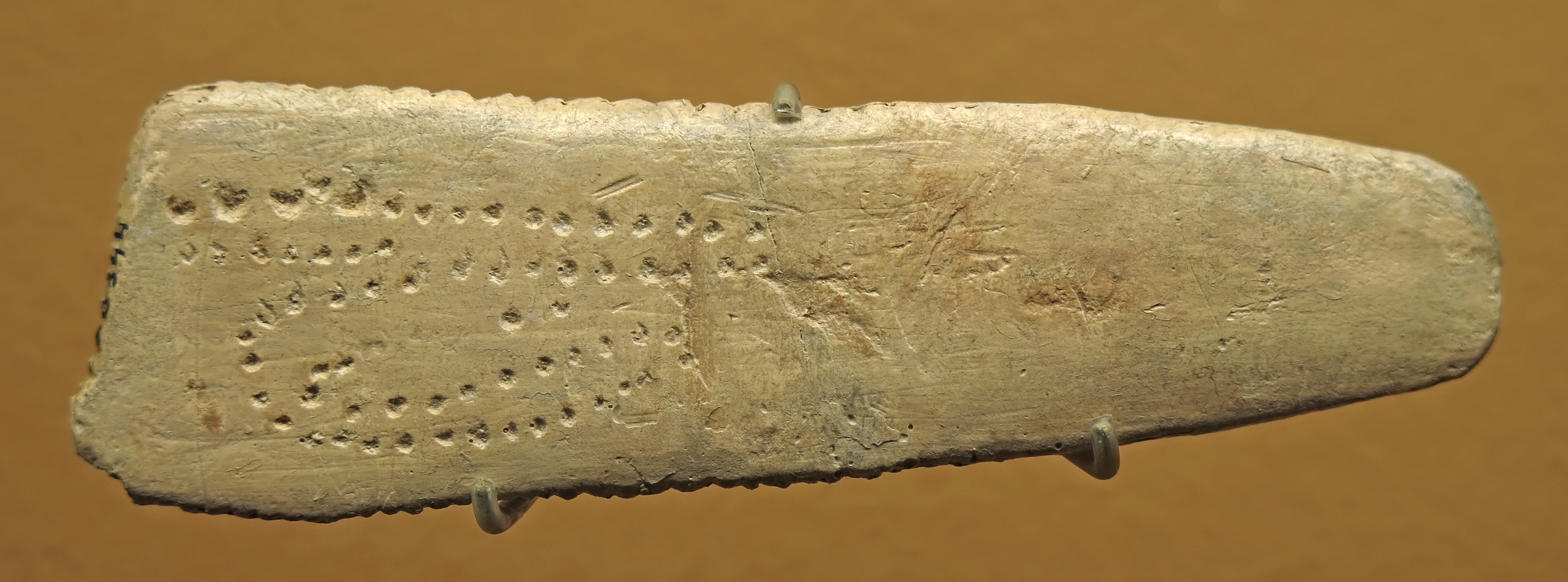
Aurignacian plaque from Castel Merle, France

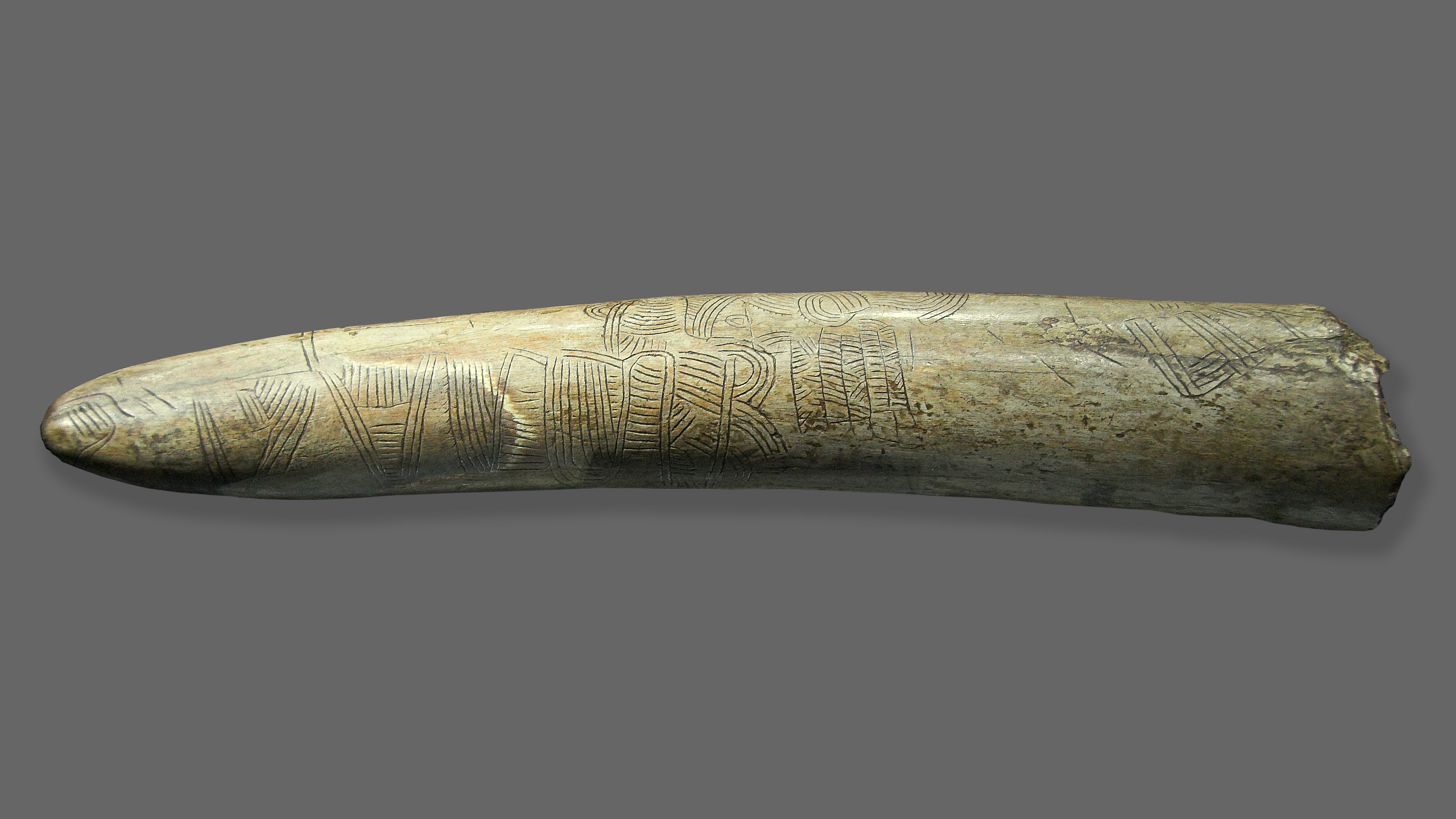
Engraved "map" on a Gravettian mammoth tusk

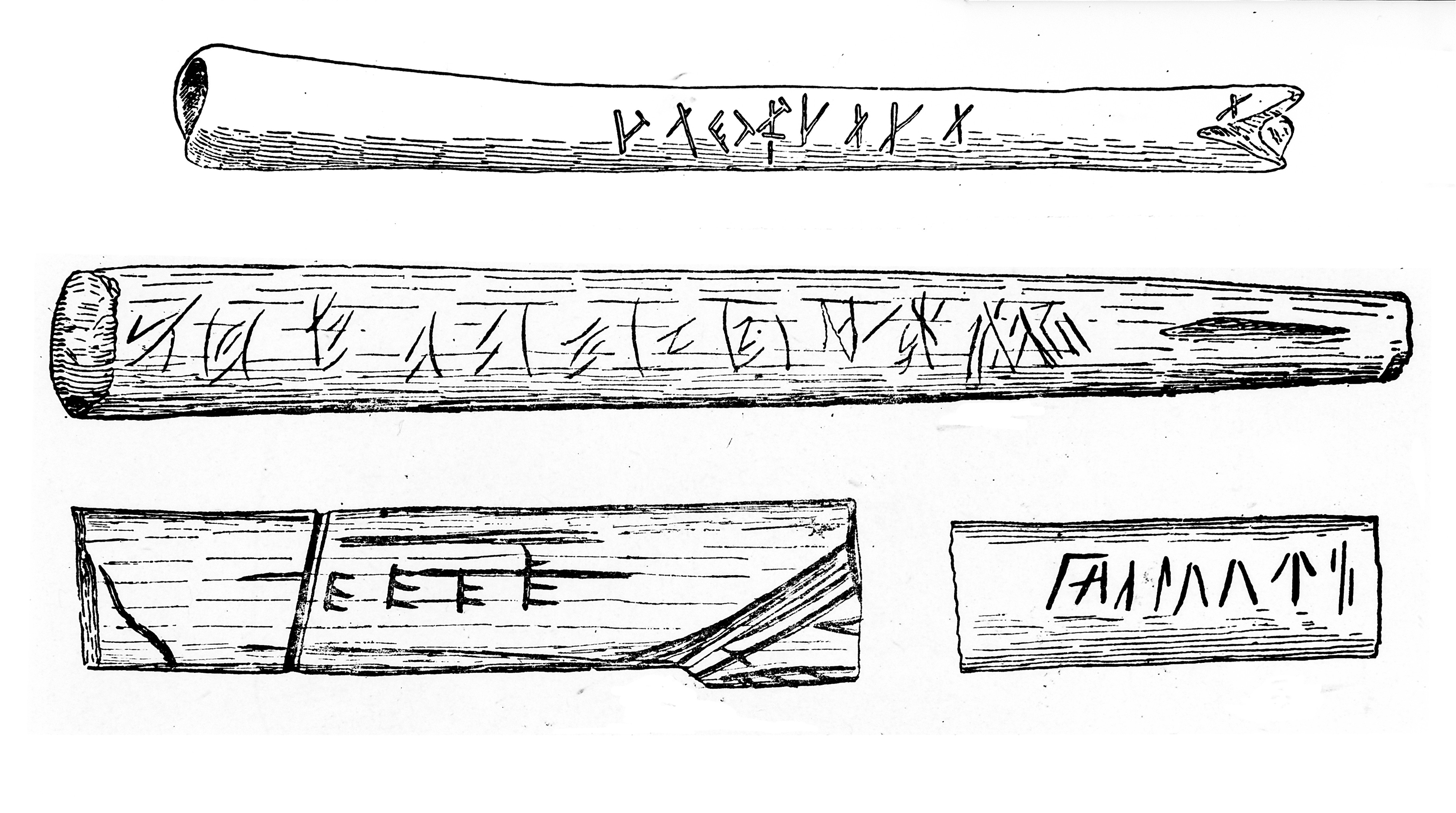
Various Magdalenian plaques with "writing"

==== Body art ====
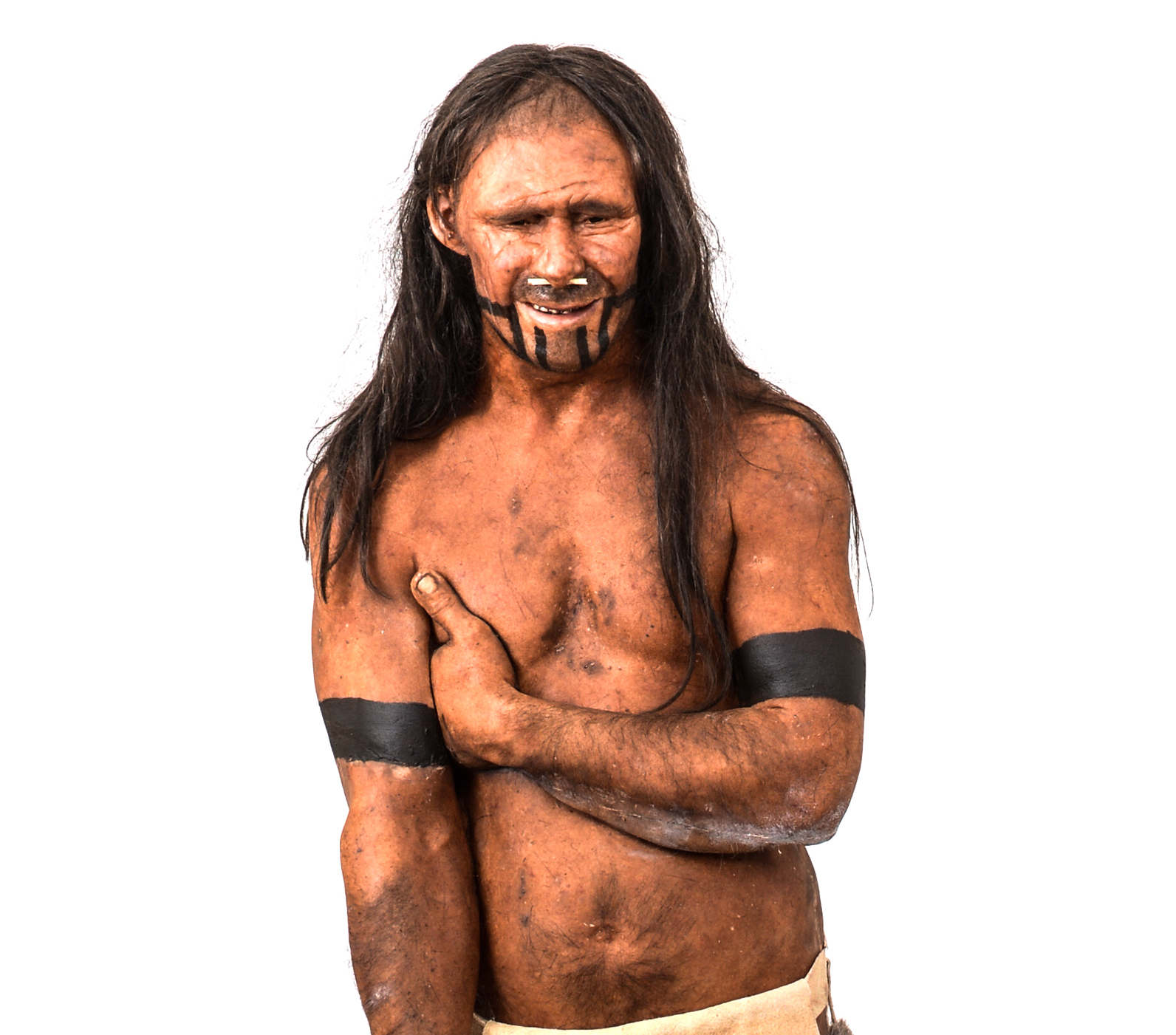
Reconstruction of a decorated Cro-Magnon man

Cro-Magnons are commonly associated with large pieces of pigments ("crayons"), namely made of red ochre. For Cro-Magnons, it is typically assumed that ochre was used for some symbolic purposes, most notably for cosmetics such as body paint. This is because ochre in some sites had to be imported from very long distances, and it is also associated with burials. It is unclear why they specifically chose red ochre instead of other colours. In terms of colour psychology, popular hypotheses include the putative "female cosmetic coalitions" hypothesis and the "red dress effect". It is also possible that ochre was chosen for its utility, such as an ingredient for adhesives, hide tanning agent, insect repellent, sunscreen, medicinal properties, dietary supplement, or as a soft hammer. Cro-Magnons appear to have been using grinding and crushing tools to process ochre before applying it to the skin.

In 1962, French archaeologists Saint-Just and Marthe Péquart identified bi-pointed needles in the Magdalenian Le Mas-d'Azil, which they speculated might have been used in tattooing. Hypothesised depictions of penises from most commonly the Magdalenian (though a few dating back to the Aurignacian) appear to be decorated with tattoos, scarification, and piercings. Designs include lines, plaques, dots or holes, and human or animal figures.

==== Clothing ====
Cro-Magnons produced beads, which are typically assumed to have been attached to clothing or portable items as body decoration. Beads had already been in use since the Middle Palaeolithic, but production dramatically increased in the Upper Palaeolithic. It is unclear why communities chose specific raw materials over other ones, and they seem to have upheld local bead making traditions for a very long time. For example, Mediterranean communities used specific types of marine shells to make beads and pendants for more than 20,000 years; and central and western European communities often used pierced animal (and less commonly human) teeth. In the Aurignacian, beads and pendants were being made of shells, teeth, ivory, stone, bone, and antler; and there are a few examples of use of fossil materials including a belemnite, nummulite, ammonite, and amber. They may have also been producing ivory and stone rings, diadems, and labrets. Beads could be manufactured in numerous different styles, such as conical, elliptical, drop-shaped, disc-shaped, ovoid, rectangular, trapezoidal, and so on. Beads may have been used to facilitate social communication, to display the wearer's socio-economic status, as they could have been capable of communicating labour costs (and thereby, a person's wealth, energy, connections, etc.) simply by looking at them. The distribution of ornaments on buried Gravettian individuals, and the likeliness that most of the buried were dressed with whatever they were wearing upon death, indicates that jewellery was primarily worn on the head as opposed to the neck or the torso.

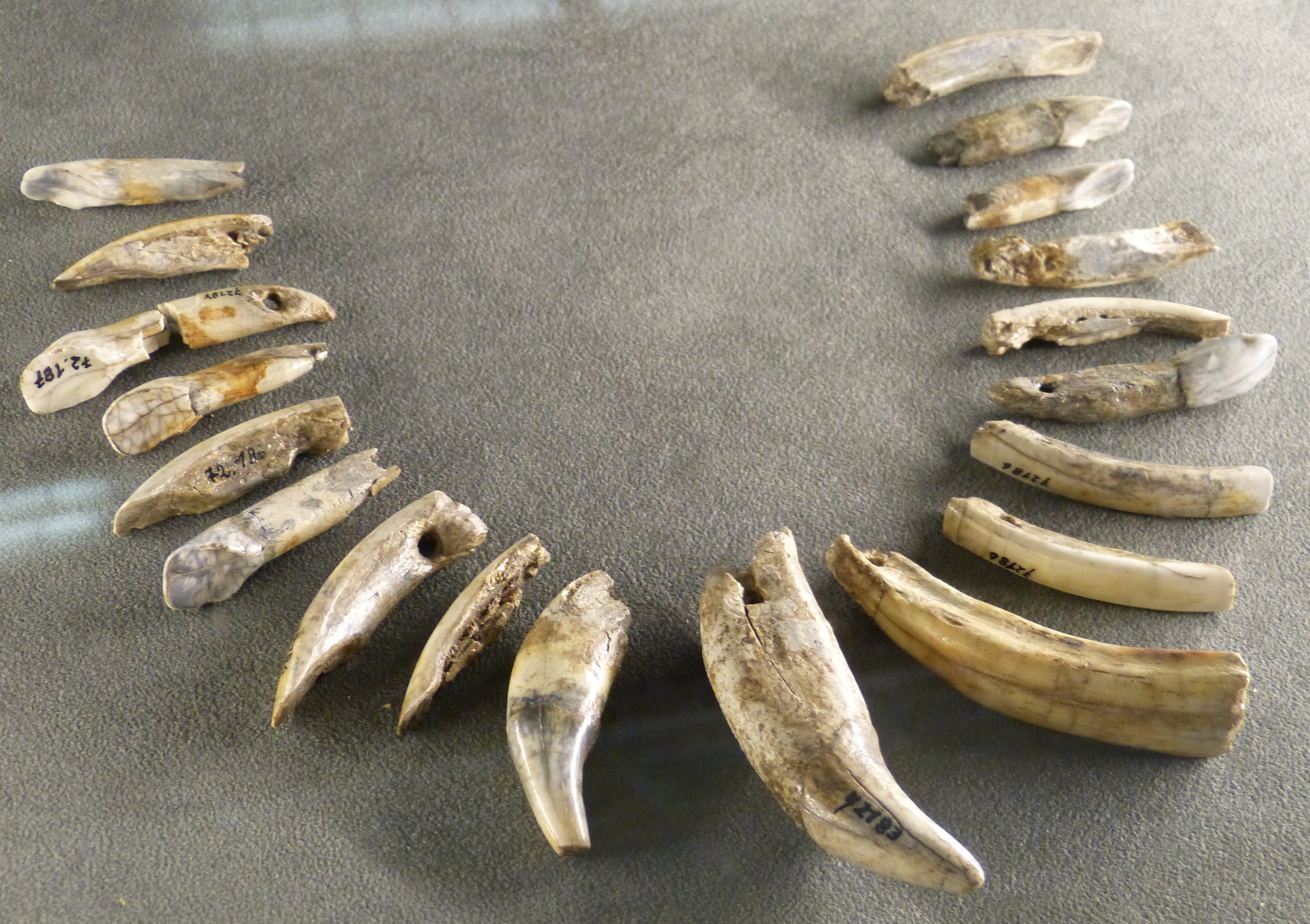
Aurignacian chain made of bear, horse, elk, and beaver teeth

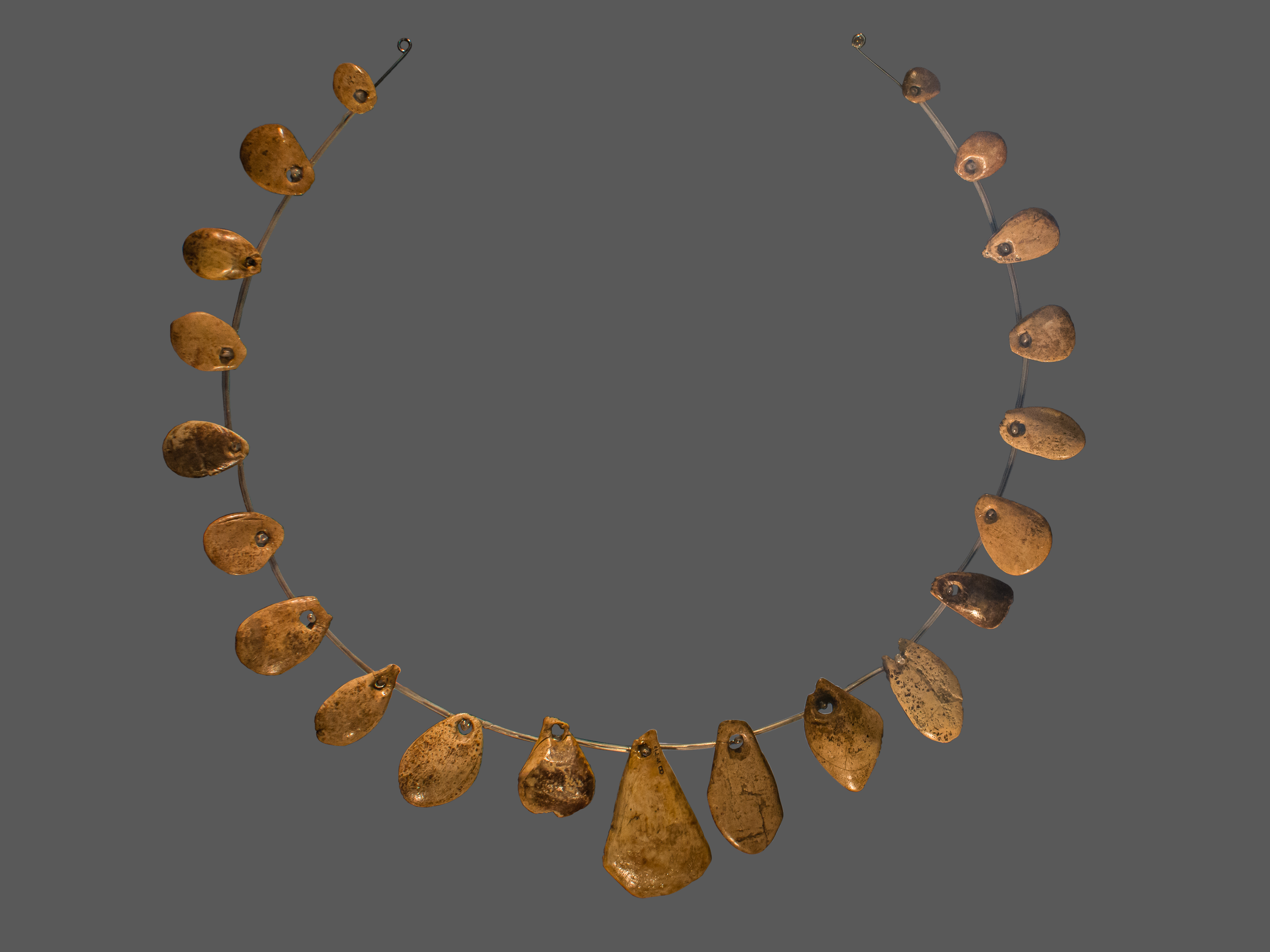
Gravettian ivory chain

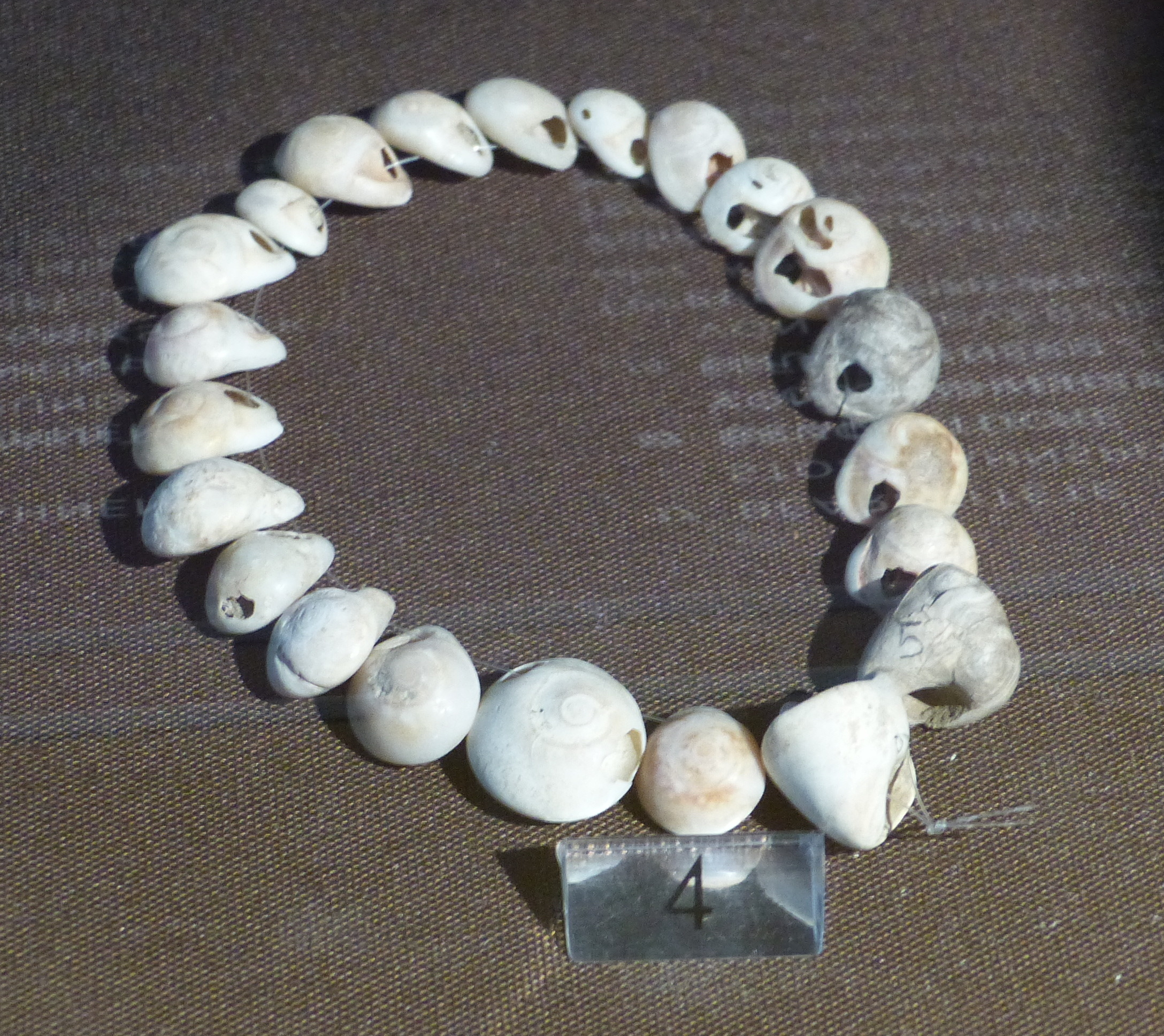
Gravettian Tritia neritea shell chain

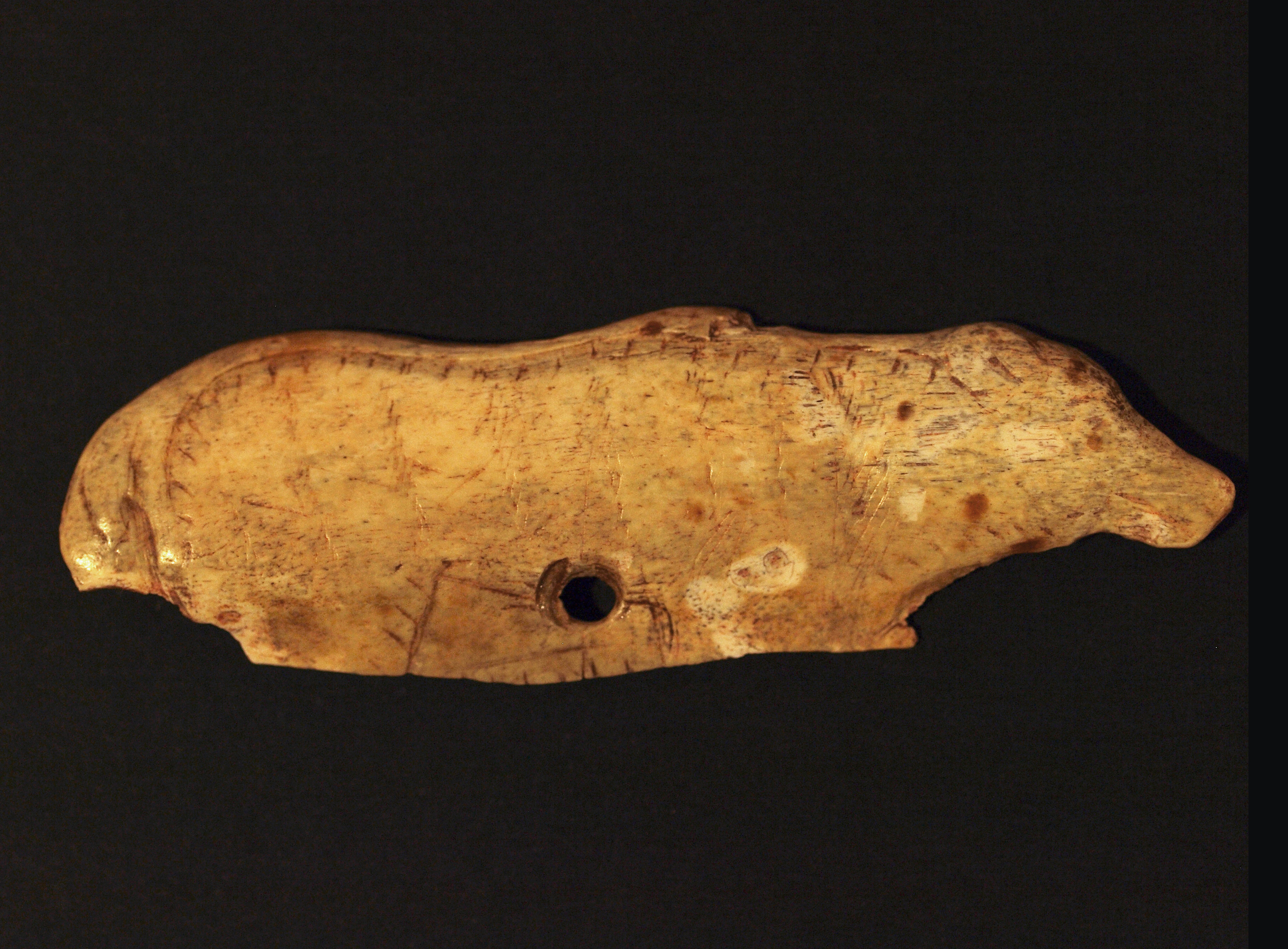
Magdalenian bear pendant made out of a deer rib

The Gravettian Dolní Věstonice I and III and Pavlov I sites in Moravia, Czech Republic, yielded many clay fragments with textile impressions. These indicate a highly sophisticated and standardised textile industry, including the production of: single-ply, double-ply, triple-ply, and braided string and cordage; knotted nets; wicker baskets; and woven cloth including simple and diagonal twined cloth, plain woven cloth, and twilled cloth. Some cloths appear to have a design pattern. There are also plaited items which may have been baskets or mats. Due to the wide range of textile gauges and weaves, it is possible they could also produce wall hangings, blankets, bags, shawls, shirts, skirts, and sashes. These people used plant rather than animal fibres, possibly nettle, milkweed, yew, or alder which have historically been used in weaving. Such plant fibre fragments have also been recorded at the Russian Kostenki and Zaraysk as well as the German Gönnersdorf site.

The inhabitants of Dzudzuana Cave, Georgia, appear to have been staining flax fibres with plant-based dyes, including yellow, red, pink, blue, turquoise, violet, black, brown, gray, green, and khaki. The emergence of textiles in the European archaeological record also coincides with the proliferation of the sewing needle in European sites. Ivory needles are found in most late Upper Palaeolithic sites, which could correlate to frequent sewing, and the predominance of small needles (too small to tailor clothes out of hide and leather) could indicate work on softer woven fabrics or accessory stitching and embroidery of leather products.

There is some potential evidence of simple loom technology. However, these have also been interpreted as either hunting implements or art pieces. Rounded objects made of mammoth phalanges from Předmostí and Avdeevo, Russia, may have been loom weights or human figures. Perforated, washer-like ivory or bone discs from across Europe were potentially spindle whorls. A foot-shaped piece of ivory from Kniegrotte, Germany, was possibly a comb or a decorative pendant. On the basis of wearing analyses, Cro-Magnons are also speculated to have used net spacers or weaving sticks. In 1960, French archaeologist Fernand Lacorre suggested that perforated batons were used to spin cordage.

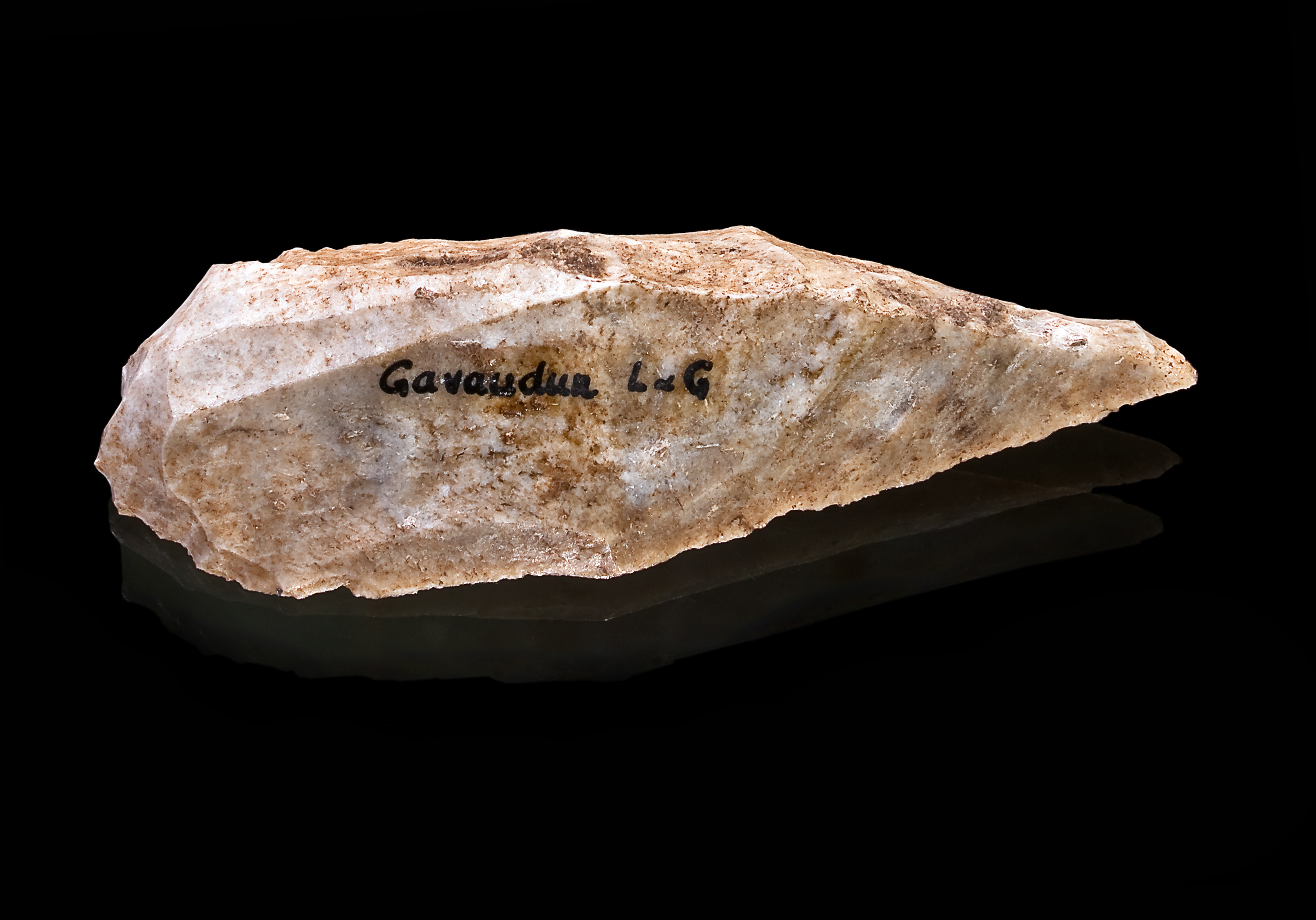
Aurignacian hide scraper from Gavaudun, France

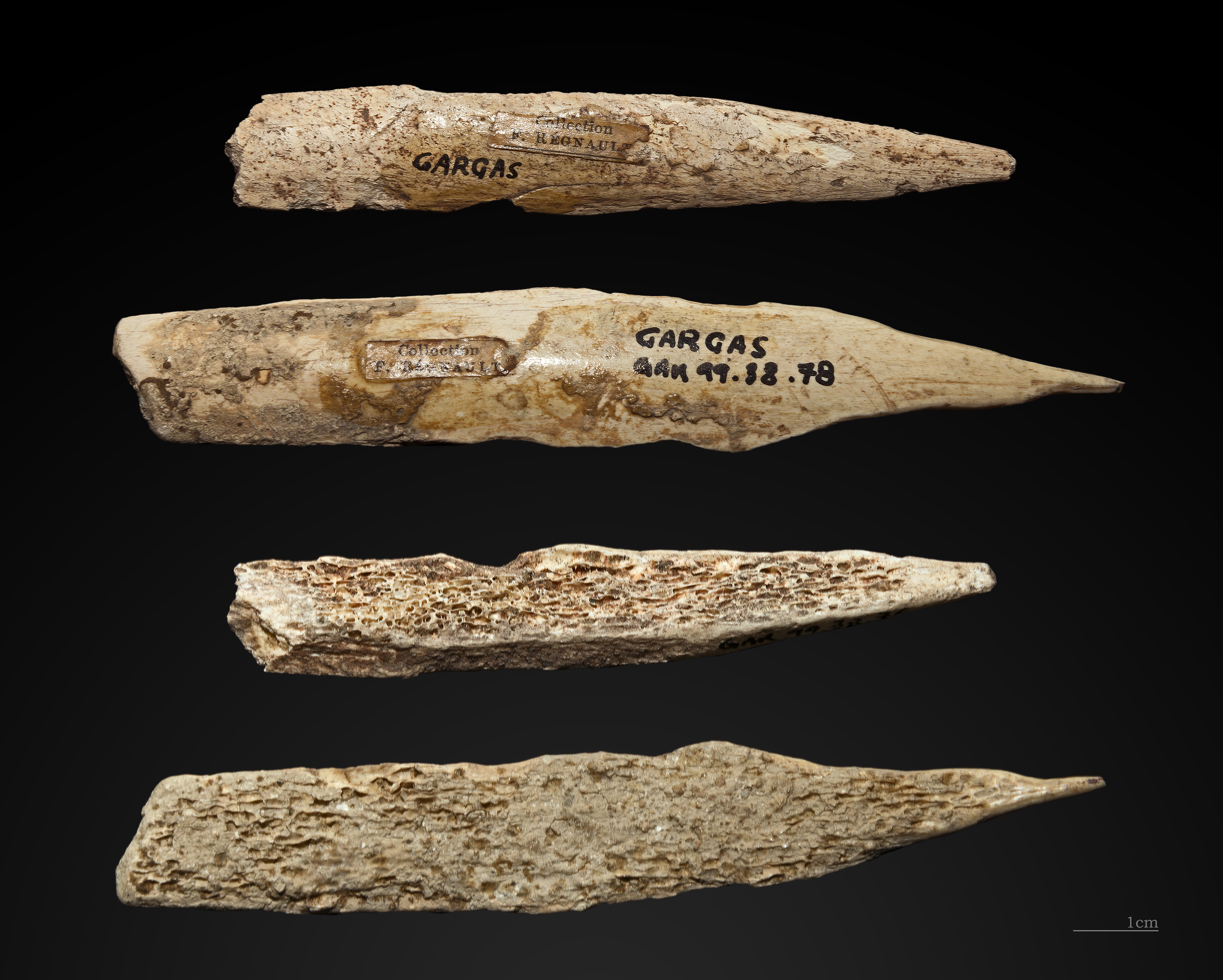
Two Gravettian awls

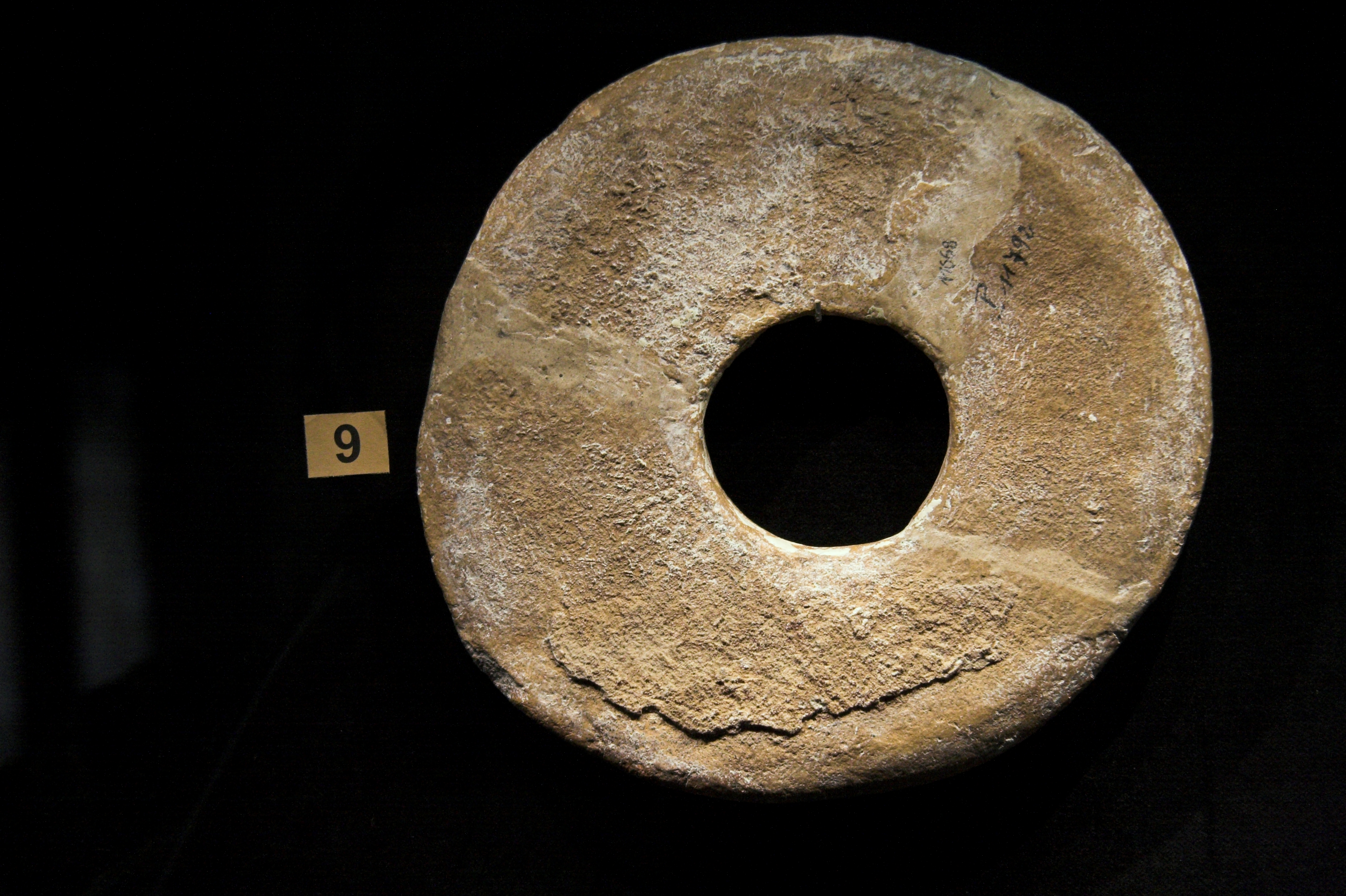
Washer-like stone disc from Předmostí, Czech Republic

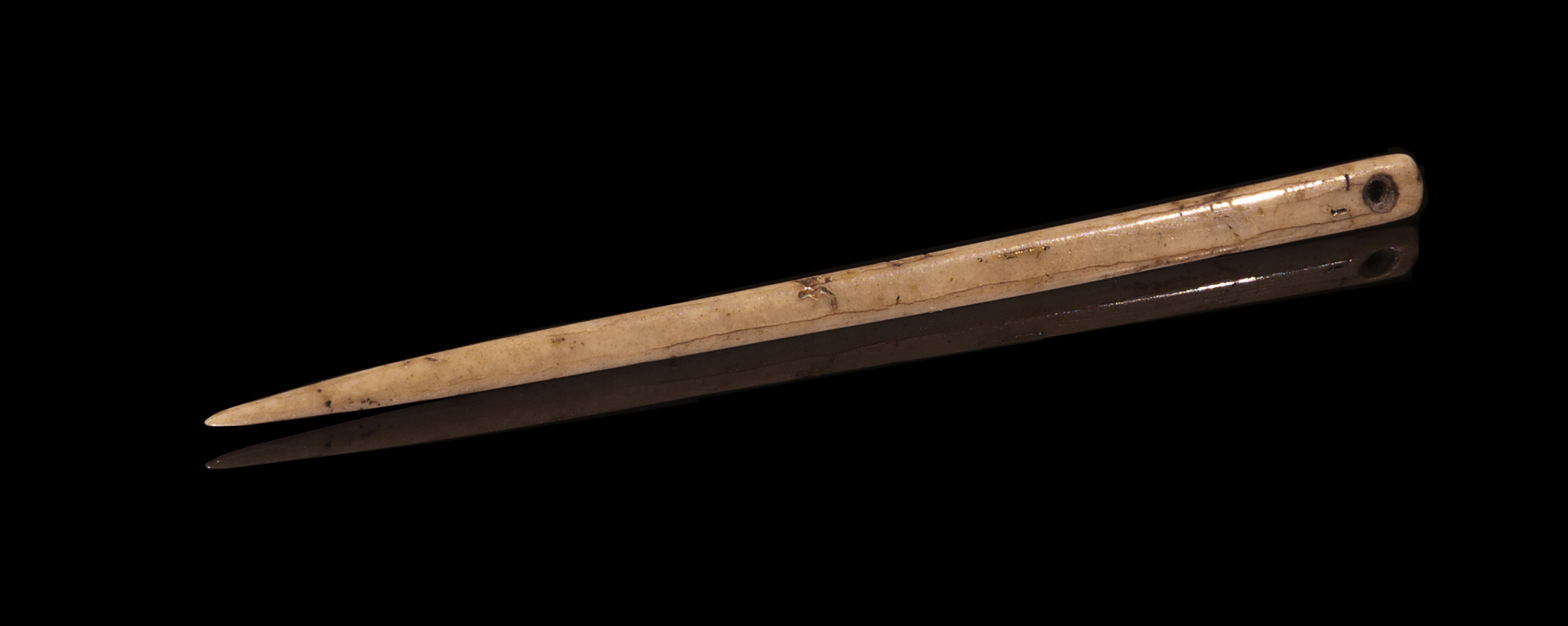
Magdalenian bone needle from Gourdan-Polignan, France

Some Venuses depict hairdos and clothing worn by Gravettian women. The Venus of Willendorf seems to be wearing a cap, possibly woven fabric or made from shells, featuring at least seven rows and an additional two half-rows covering the nape of the neck. It may have been made starting at a knotted centre and spiraling downward from right to left, and then backstitching all the rows to each other. The Kostenki-1 Venus seems to be wearing a similar cap, though each row seems to overlap the other. The Venus of Brassempouy seems to be wearing some nondescript open, twined hair cover. The engraved Venus of Laussel from France seems to be wearing some headwear with rectangular gridding, and could potentially represent a snood. Most East European Venuses with headwear also display notching and checkwork on the upper body which are suggestive of bandeaux (a strip of cloth bordering around the tops of the breasts) with some even featuring straps connecting it to around the neck; these seem to be absent in western European Venuses. Some also wear belts: in eastern Europe, these are seen on the waist; whereas in central and western Europe they are worn on the low hip. The Venus of Lespugue seems to be wearing a plant fibre string skirt comprising 11 cords running behind the legs.

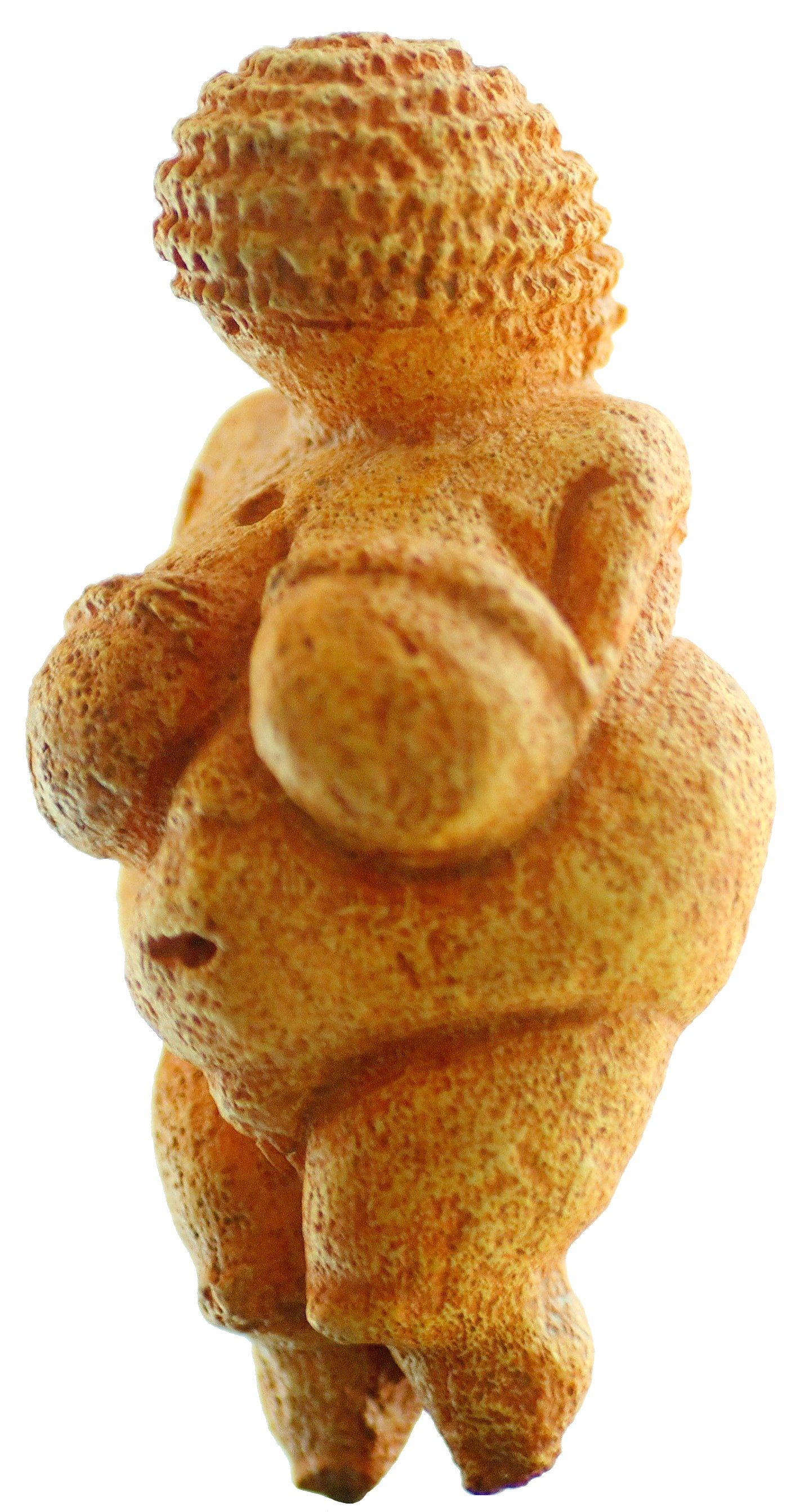
Venus of Willendorf wearing a cap

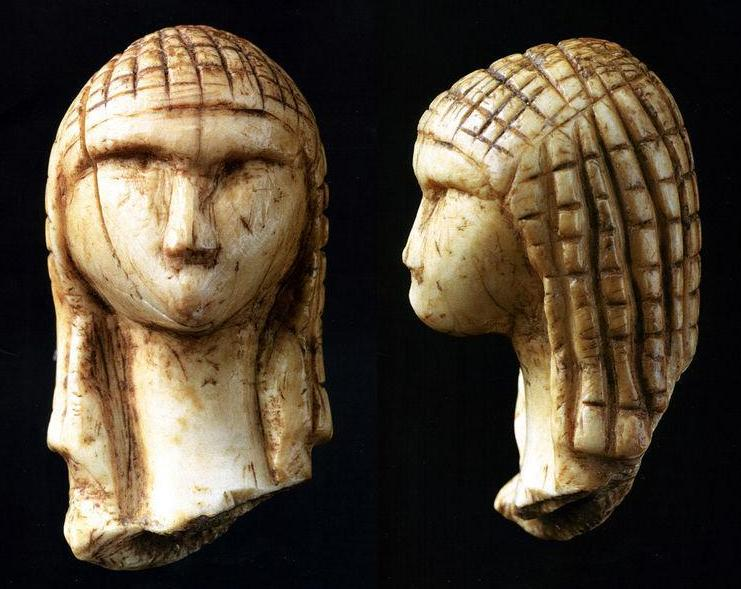
Venus of Brassempouy wearing a hair cover

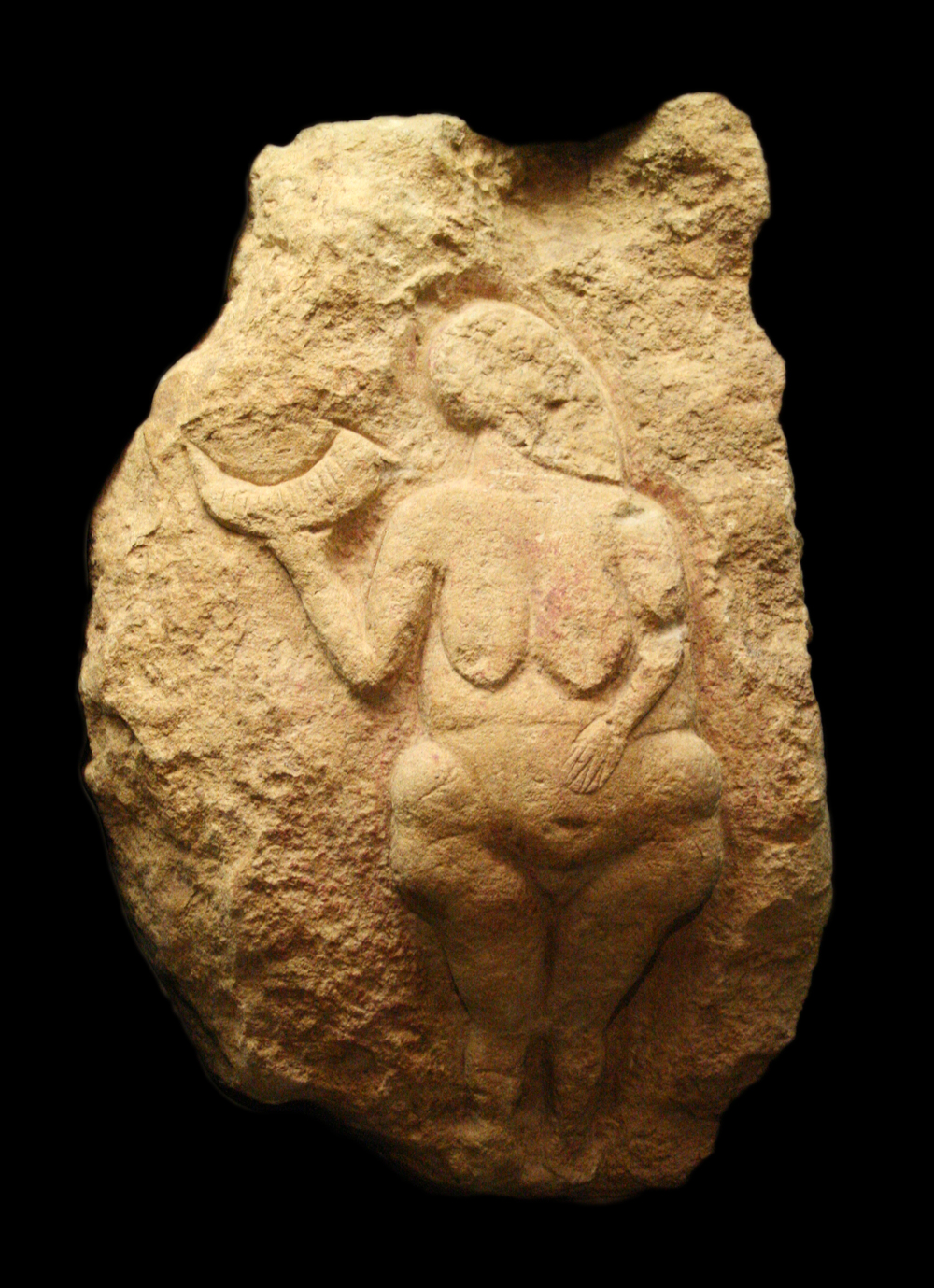
Venus of Laussel wearing a snood

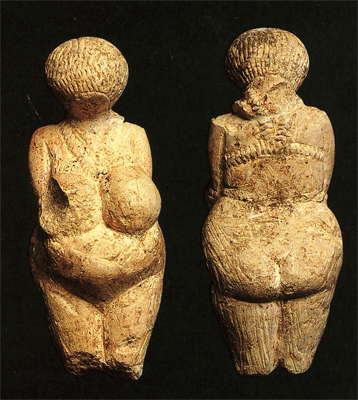
A Venus from Kostenki showing a bandeau with straps

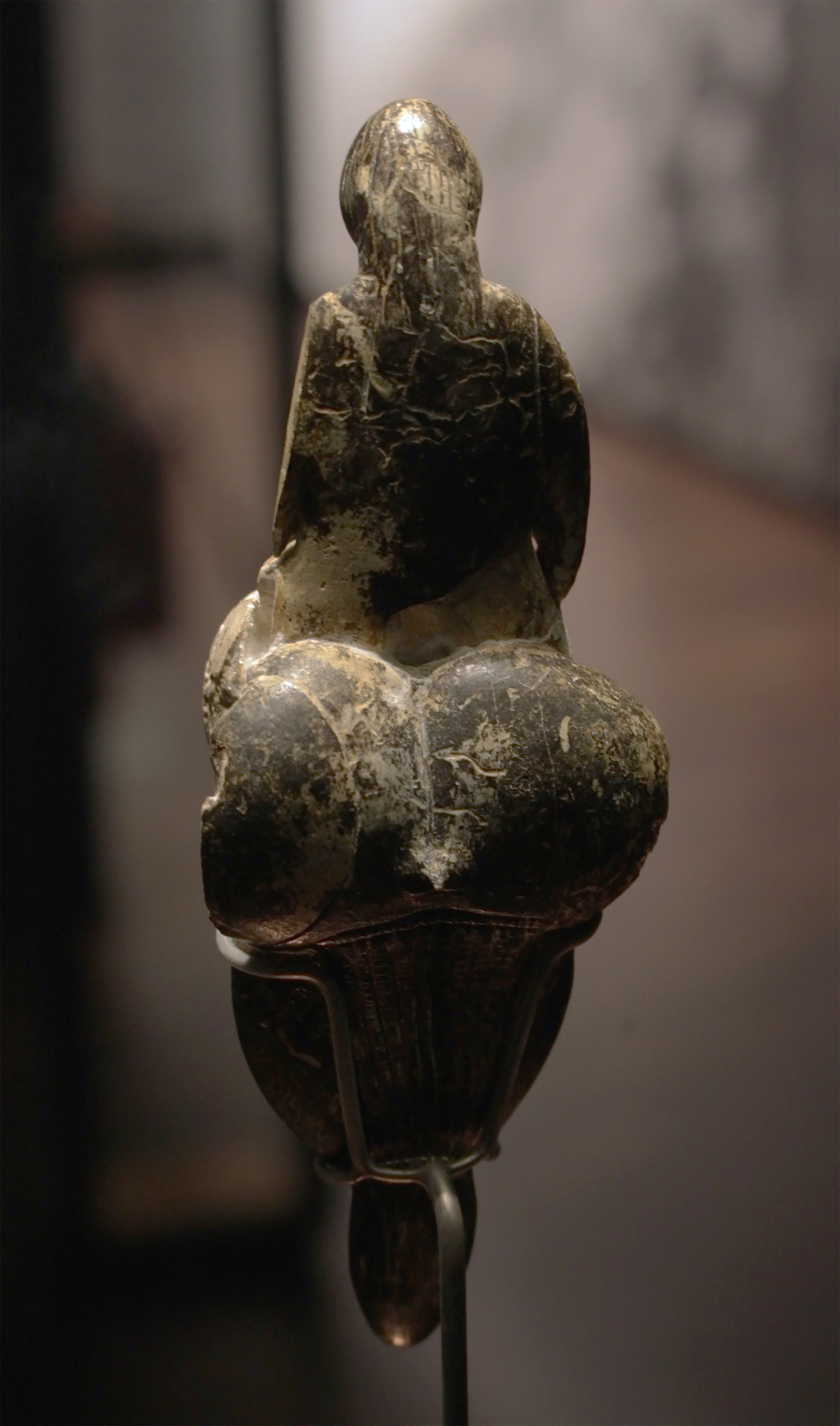
Venus of Lespugue wearing a skirt

==== Music ====
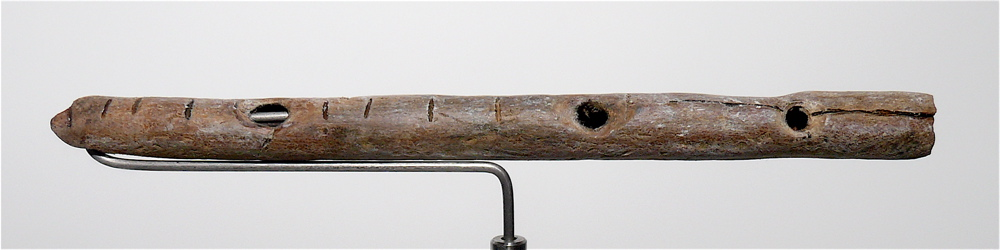
Replica of an Aurignacian bone flute from Geissenklösterle, Germany

Music played with a replica of the 33,000-year-old Izturitz flute found in the Isturitz and Oxocelhaya caves

Cro-Magnons are known to have created flutes out of hollow bird bones as well as mammoth ivory, first appearing in the archaeological record with the Aurignacian about 40,000 years ago in the German Swabian Jura. The Swabian Jura flutes appear to have been able to produce a wide range of tones. One virtually complete flute made of the radius of a griffon vulture from Hohle Fels measures 21.8 cm (8.6 in) in length and 0.8 cm (0.31 in) in diameter. The bone had been smoothed down and was pierced with holes. These finger holes exhibit cut marks, which could indicate the exact placement of these holes was specifically measured to create concert pitch (that is, to make the instrument in tune) or a scale. The part near the elbow joint had two V-shaped carvings, presumably a mouthpiece. Ivory flutes would have required a great time investment to make, as it requires more skill and precision to craft compared to a bird bone flute. A section of ivory must be sawed off to the correct size, cut in half so it can be hollowed out, and then the two pieces have to be refitted and stuck together by an adhesive in an air-tight seal. Cro-Magnons also created bone whistles out of deer phalanges.

Such sophisticated music technology could potentially speak to a much longer musical tradition than the archaeological record indicates, as modern hunter-gatherers have been documented to create instruments out of: more biodegradable materials (less likely to fossilise) such as reeds, gourds, skins, and bark; more or less unmodified items such as horns, conch shells, logs, and stones; and their weapons, including spear thrower shafts or boomerangs as clapsticks, or a hunting bow.

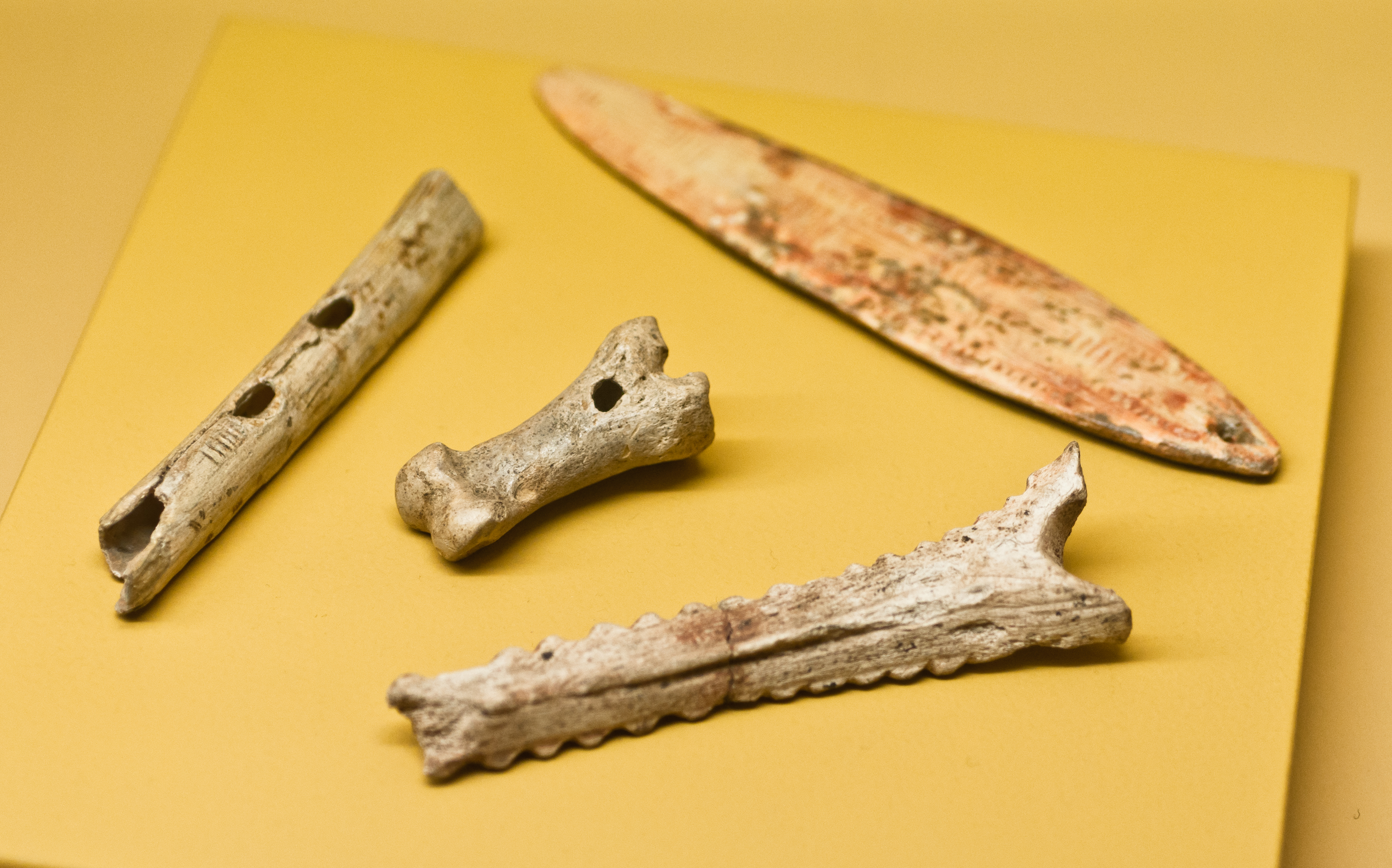
Potential Cro-Magnon musical instruments: bone flute (left), whistle (centre), idiophone (bottom), and bullroarer (top)

It is speculated that a few Cro-Magnon artefacts represent bullroarers or percussion instruments such as rasps, but these are harder to prove. One probable bullroarer is identified at Lalinde, France, dating to 12,000 to 14,000 years ago, measuring 16 cm (6.3 in) long and decorated with geometric incisions. In the mammoth-bone houses at Mezine, Ukraine, an 80 cm × 20 cm (31.5 in × 7.9 in) thigh-bone, a 53 cm × 50 cm (21 in × 20 in) jawbone, a 57 cm × 63 cm (22 in × 25 in) shoulder blade, and a 63 cm × 43 cm (25 in × 17 in) pelvis of a mammoth bear evidence of paint and repeated percussion. These were first proposed by archaeologist Sergei Bibikov to have served as drums, with either a reindeer antler or mammoth tusk fragment also found at the site being used as a drum stick, though this is contested. Other European sites have yielded potential percussion mallets made of mammoth bone or reindeer antler. It is speculated that some Cro-Magnons marked certain sections of caves with red paint which could be struck to produce a note that would resonate throughout the cave chamber, somewhat like a xylophone.

=== Language ===
The early modern human vocal apparatus is generally thought to have been the same as that in present-day humans, as the present-day variation of the FOXP2 gene associated with the neurological prerequisites for speech and language ability seems to have evolved within the last 100,000 years, and the modern human hyoid bone (which supports the tongue and facilitates speech) evolved by 60,000 years ago demonstrated by the Israeli Skhul and Qafzeh humans. These indicate Upper Palaeolithic humans had the anatomical basis for language and the same range of potential phonemes (sounds) as present-day humans.

Though Cro-Magnon languages likely contributed to present-day languages, it is unclear what early languages would have sounded like because words denature and are replaced by entirely original words quite rapidly, making it difficult to identity language cognates (a word in multiple different languages which descended from a common ancestor) which originated before 5,000 to 9,000 years ago. Nonetheless, it has been controversially hypothesised that Eurasian languages are all related and form the "Nostratic languages" with an early common ancestor existing just after the end of the LGM. In 2013, evolutionary biologist Mark Pagel and colleagues postulated that among "Nostratic languages", frequently used words more often have speculated cognates, and that this was evidence that 23 identified words were "ultraconserved" and supposedly changed very little in use and pronunciation, descending from a common ancestor about 15,000 years ago at the end of the LGM. Archaeologist Paul Heggarty said that Pagel's data was subjective interpretation of supposed cognates, and the extreme volatility of sound and pronunciation of words (for example, Latin [ˈakʷã] (aquam) "water" → French [o] (eau) in just 2,000 years) makes it unclear if cognates can even be identified that far back if they do indeed exist.

=== Religion ===
==== Shamanism ====
Several Upper Palaeolithic caves feature depictions of seemingly part-human, part-animal chimaeras (typically part bison, reindeer, or deer), variously termed "anthropozoomorphs", "therianthropes", or "sorcerers". These have typically been interpreted as being the centre of some shamanistic ritual, and to represent some cultural revolution and the origins of subjectivity. The oldest such cave drawing has been identified at the 30,000-year-old Chauvet Cave, where a figure with a bison upper body and human lower body was drawn onto a stalactite, facing a depiction of a vulva with two tapering legs. The 17,000-year-old Grotte de Lascaux, France, has a seemingly dead bird-human hybrid between a rhino and a charging bison, with a bird on top of a pole placed near the figure's right hand. A bird on a stick is used as a symbol of mystical power by some modern shamanistic cultures who believe that birds are psychopomps, and can move between the land of the living and the land of the dead. In these cultures, they believe the shaman can either transform into a bird or use a bird as a spirit guide. The 14,000-year-old Grotte des Trois-Frères, France, features 3 sorcerers. The so-called "The Dancing Sorcerer" or "God of Les Trois Frères" seems to bear human legs and feet, paws, a deer head with antlers, a fox or horse tail, a beard, and a flaccid penis, interpreted as dancing on all-fours. Another smaller sorcerer with a bison head, human legs and feet, and upright posture stands above several animal depictions, and is interpreted as holding and playing a musical bow to herd all the animals. The third sorcerer has a seemingly bison upper body and human lower body with testicles and an erection.

Some drawn human figures feature lines radiating out. These are generally interpreted as wounded people, with the lines representing pain or spears, possibly related to some initiation process for shamans. One such "wounded man" at Grotte de Cougnac, France, is drawn on the chest of a red Irish elk. A wounded sorcerer with a bison head is found at the 17,000-year-old Grotte de Gabillou. Some caves featured "vanquished men", lying presumably dead at the foot of generally a bull or bear.

For tangible art, the early Aurignacian Hohlenstein-Stadel, Swabian Jura, has yielded the famous Lion-man sculpture. It is 30 cm (12 in) tall, which is much larger than the other Swabian Jura figurines. A possible second lion-human was also found in the nearby Hohle Fels. An ivory slab from Geissenklösterle has a carved relief of a human figure with its arms raised in the air wearing a hide, the "worshipper". A 28,000-year-old "puppet" was identified at Brno, Czech Republic, consisting of an isolated head piece, torso piece, and left arm piece. It is presumed that the head and torso were connected by a rod, and the torso and arm by some string allowing the arm to move. Because it was found in a grave, this is speculated to have belonged to a shaman for use in rituals involving the dead. A 14,000-year-old large stone from Cueva del Juyo, Spain, seems to have been carved to be the conjoined face of a man on the right and a big cat on the left (when facing it). The man half seems to feature a moustache and a beard. The cat half (either a leopard or a lion) has slanting eyes, a snout, a fang, and spots on the muzzle suggestive of whiskers.

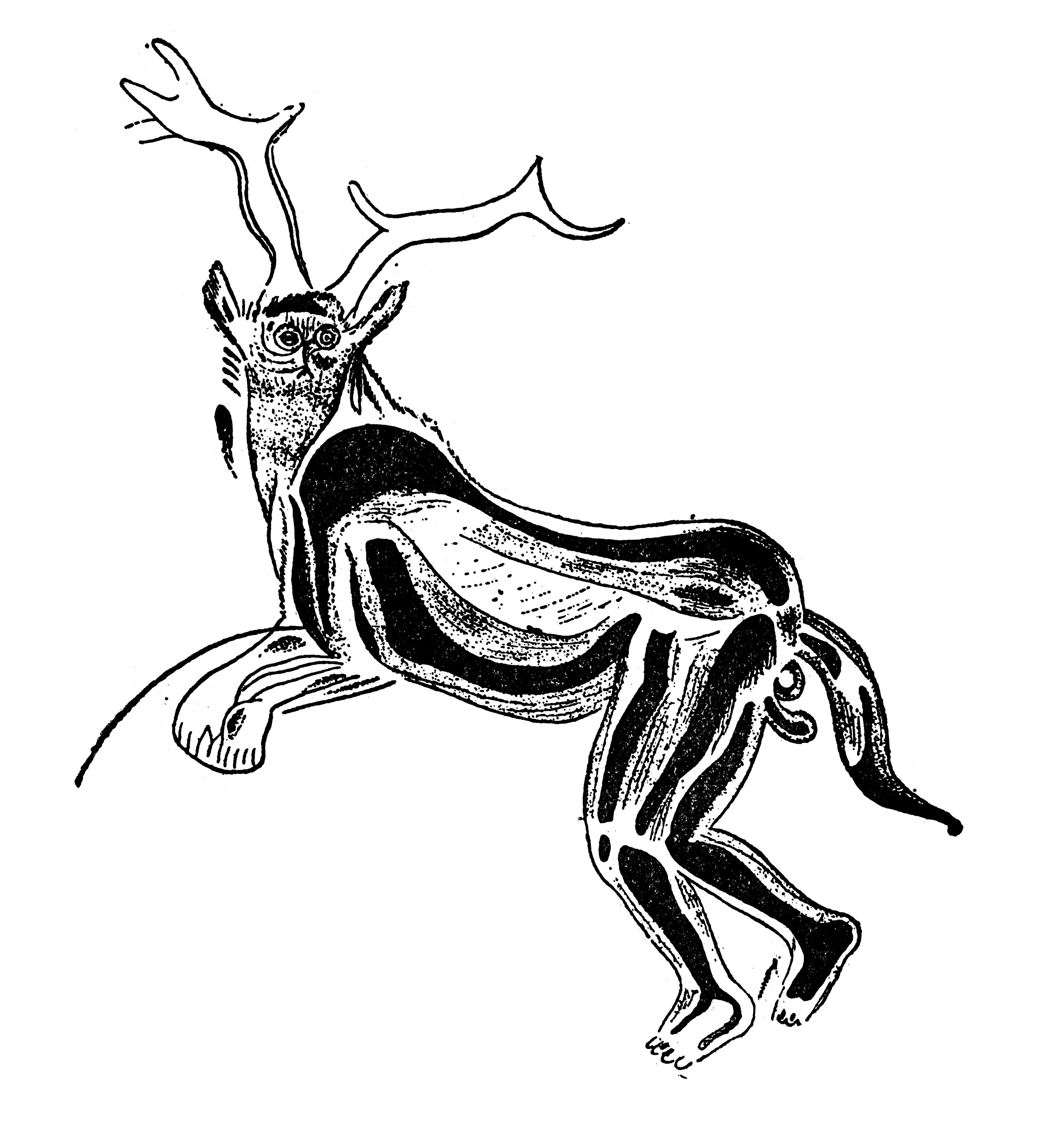
The Dancing Sorcerer from Grotte des Trois-Frères

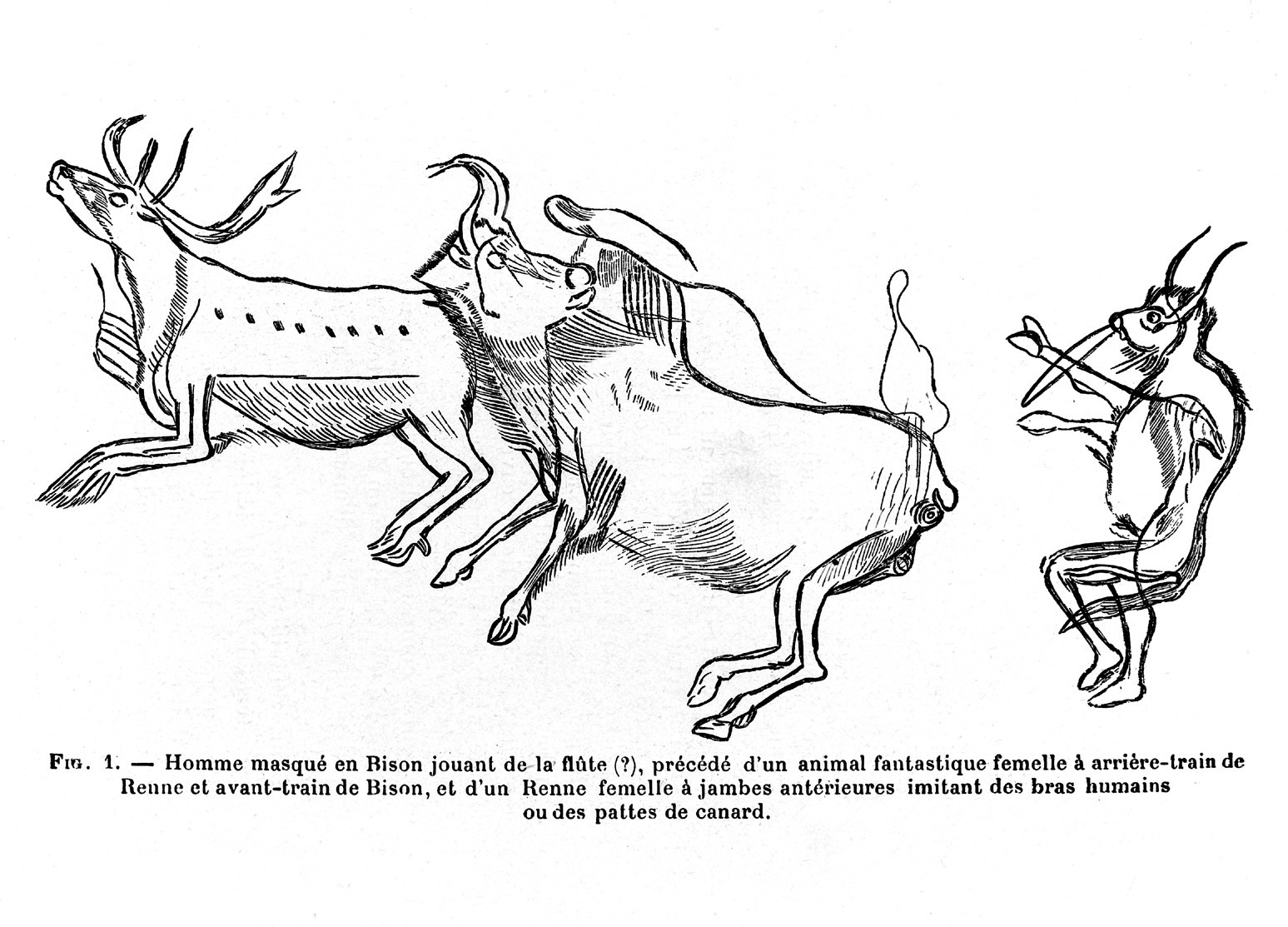
Sorcerer from Grotte des Trois-Frères with a musical bow

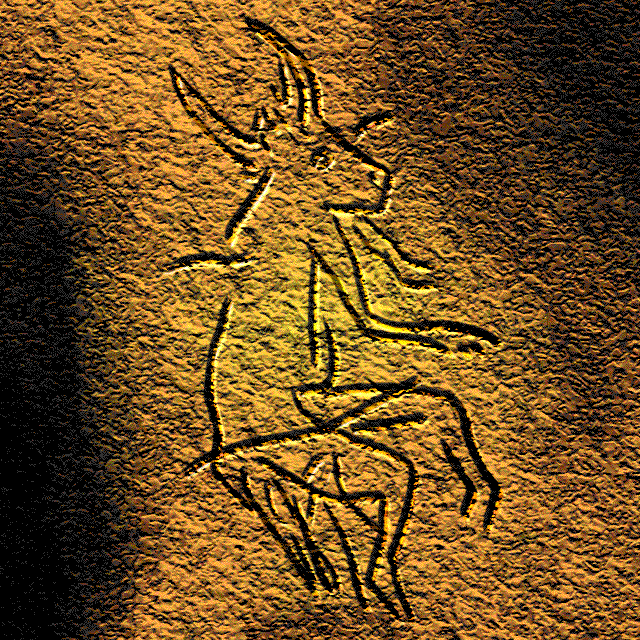
The wounded sorcerer from Grotte de Gabillou

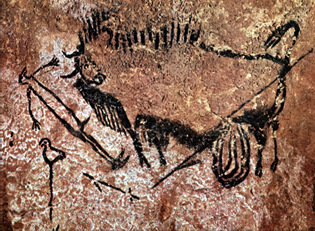
The vanquished bird-headed man from Lascaux

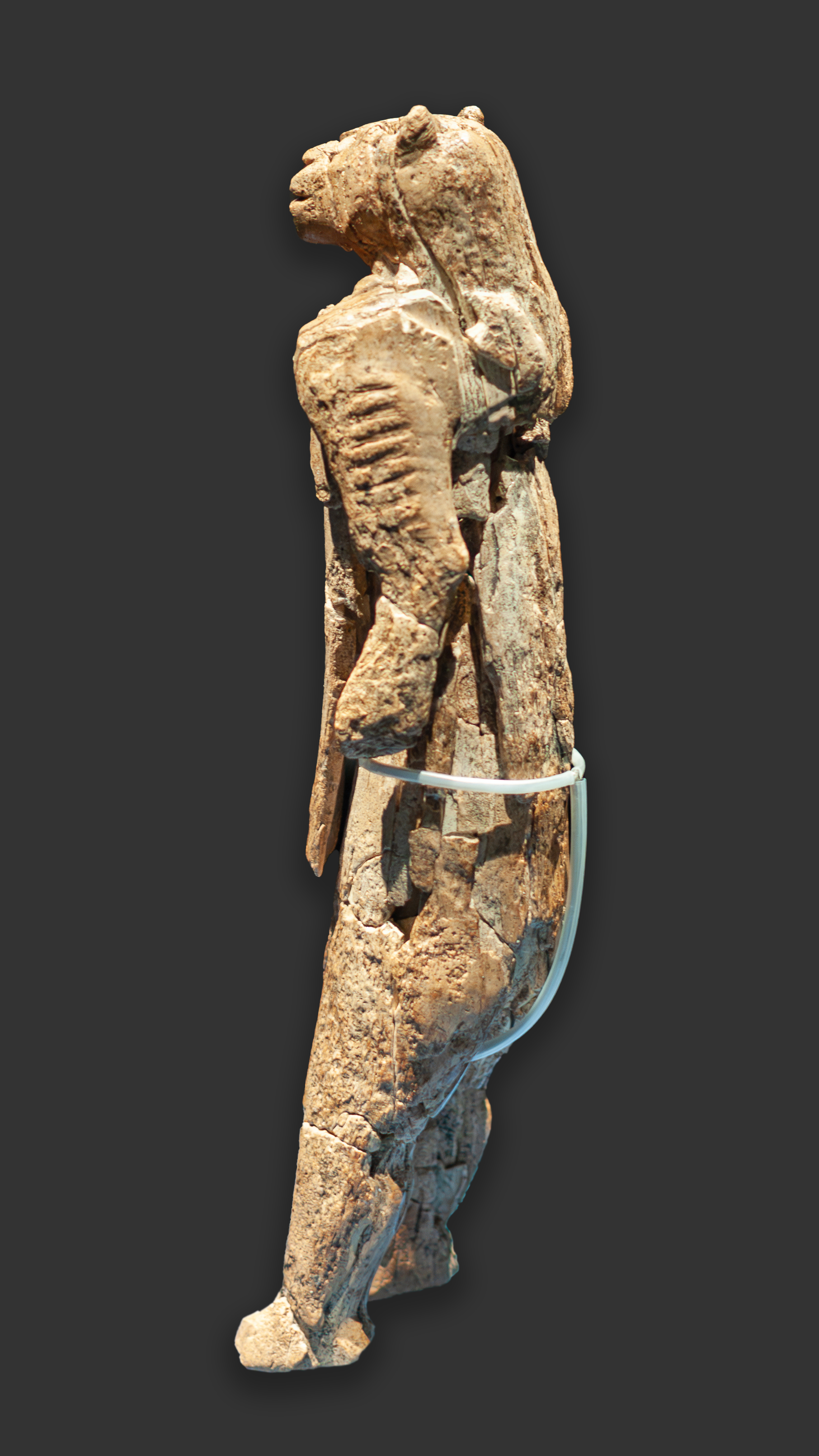
The lion-human from Hohlenstein-Stadel

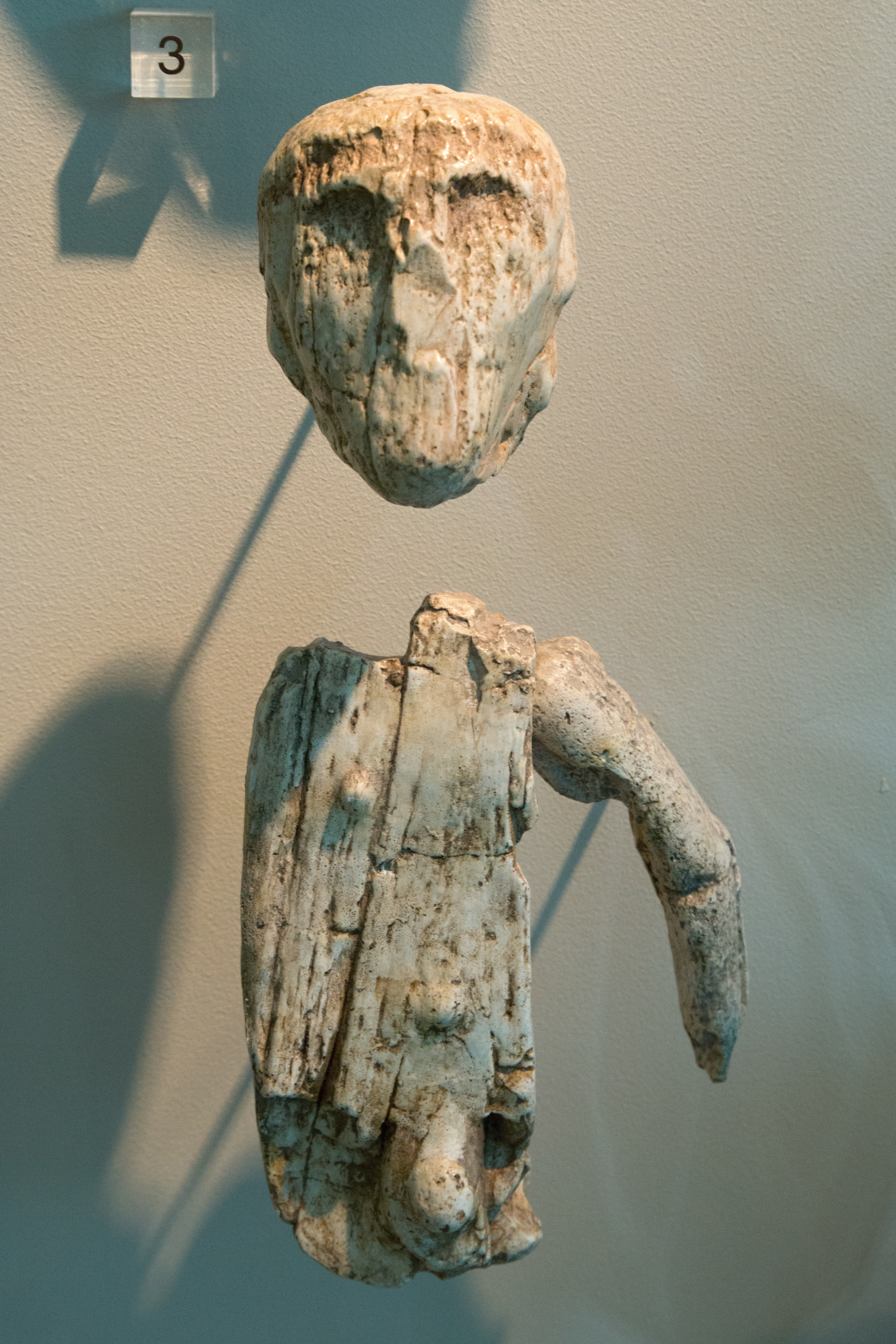
The male puppet from Brno

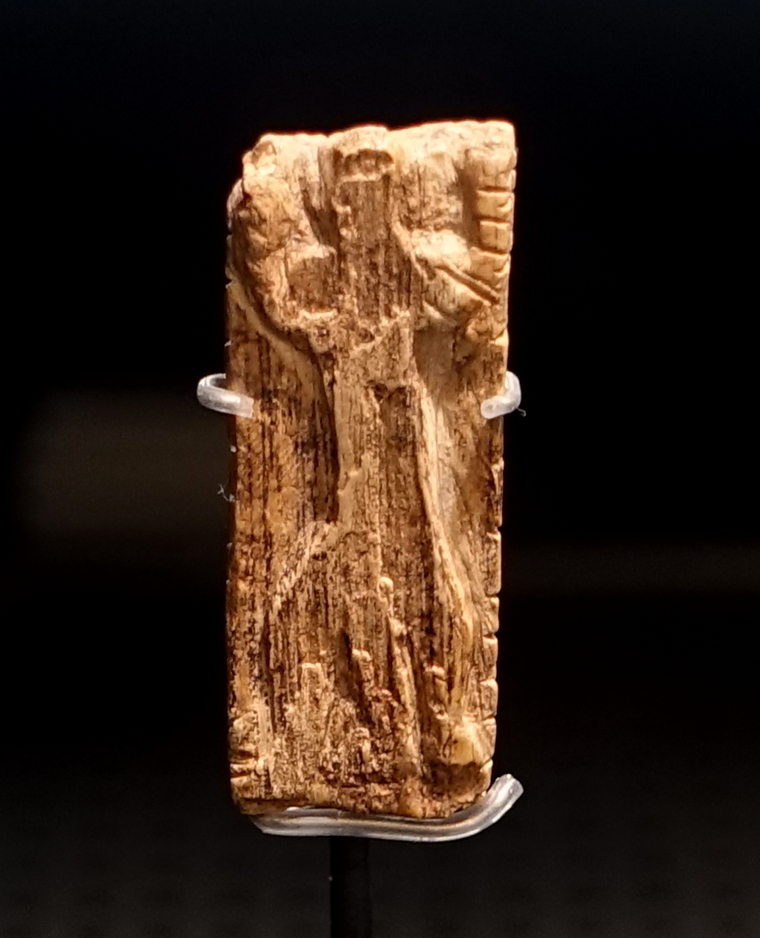
The worshipper from Geissenklösterle

Spanish archaeologists Leslie G. Freeman and Joaquín González Echegaray argued that Cueva del Juyo was specifically modified to serve as a sanctuary site to carry out rituals. They said the inhabitants dug out a triangular trench and filled it with offerings including Patella (limpets), the common periwinkle (a sea snail), pigments, the legs and jaws (possibly with meat still on them) of red and roe deer, and a red deer antler positioned upright. The trench and offerings were then filled in with dirt, and a seemingly flower-like arrangement of bright cylindrical pieces of red, yellow, and green pigments was placed on top. This was then buried with clay, stone slabs, and bone spearpoints. The clay shell was covered by a 900 kg (2,000 lb) slab of limestone supported by large flat stones. Somewhat similar structures associated with some representation of a human have also been found elsewhere in Magdalenian Spain, such as at Entrefoces rock shelter, Cueva de la Garma or Cueva de Praileaitz, Errallako Koba, and Isturitz and Oxocelhaya caves in the Basque Country.

==== Mortuary practices ====
Cro-Magnons buried their dead, commonly with a variety of symbolic grave goods as well as red ochre, and multiple people were often buried in the same grave. However, the archaeological record has yielded few graves, less than 5 preserved per millennium, which could indicate burials were seldom given. Consequently, it is unclear if they represent isolated burials or form a much more generalised mortuary tradition. Across Europe, some graves contained multiple individuals, in this case most often featuring both sexes.

Most burials are dated to the Gravettian (most notably 29,000 to 31,000 years ago) and towards the end of the Magdalenian (from 11,000 to 14,000 years ago). None are identified during the Aurignacian. Gravettian burials seem to differ from post-LGM ones. The former ranged across Europe from Portugal to Siberia, whereas the latter conspicuously restricted to Italy, Germany, and southwest France. About half of buried Gravettians were infants, whereas infant burials were much less common post-LGM, but it is debated if this was due to social differences or infant mortality rates. Graves are also commonly associated with animal remains and tools, but it is unclear if this was intentional or was coincidentally a part of the filler. They are much less common post-LGM, and post-LGM graves are more commonly associated with ornaments than Gravettian graves.

The most lavish Palaeolithic burial is a grave from the Gravettian of Sungir, Russia, where a boy and a girl were placed crown-to-crown in a long, shallow grave, and adorned with thousands of perforated ivory beads, hundreds of perforated arctic fox canines, ivory pins, disc pendants, ivory animal figurines, and mammoth tusk spears. The beads were a third the size of those found with a man from the same site, which could indicate these small beads were specifically designed for the children. Only two other Upper Palaeolithic graves were found with grave goods other than personal adornment (one from Arene Candide, Italy, and Brno, Czech Republic), and the grave of these two children is unique in bearing any functional implements (the spears) as well as a bone from another individual (a partial femur). The 5 other buried individuals from Sungir did not receive nearly as many grave goods, with one seemingly given no formal treatment whatsoever. However, most Gravettian graves feature few ornaments, and the buried were probably wearing them before death.

Due to such rich material culture and the marked difference of treatment between different individuals, it has been suggested that these peoples had a complex society beyond band level, and with social class distinction. In this model, young individuals given elaborate funerals were potentially born into a position of high status. However, about 75% of Cro-Magnon skeletons were men, which sharply contrasts with the predominance of depictions of women in art. Because of the great amount of time, labour, and resources all these grave goods would have required, it has been hypothesised that the grave goods were made long in advance of the ceremony. Because of such planning for multiple burials as well as their abundance in the archaeological record, the seemingly purposeful presence of both sexes, and an apparent preference for individuals with some congenital disorder (about a third of identified burials), it is generally speculated that these cultures practiced human sacrifice either in fear, disdain, or worship of those with abnormal features, like in many present-day and historical societies. Intricate funerals, in addition to evidence of shamanism and ritualism, has also provoked hypotheses of the belief of an afterlife by Cro-Magnons.

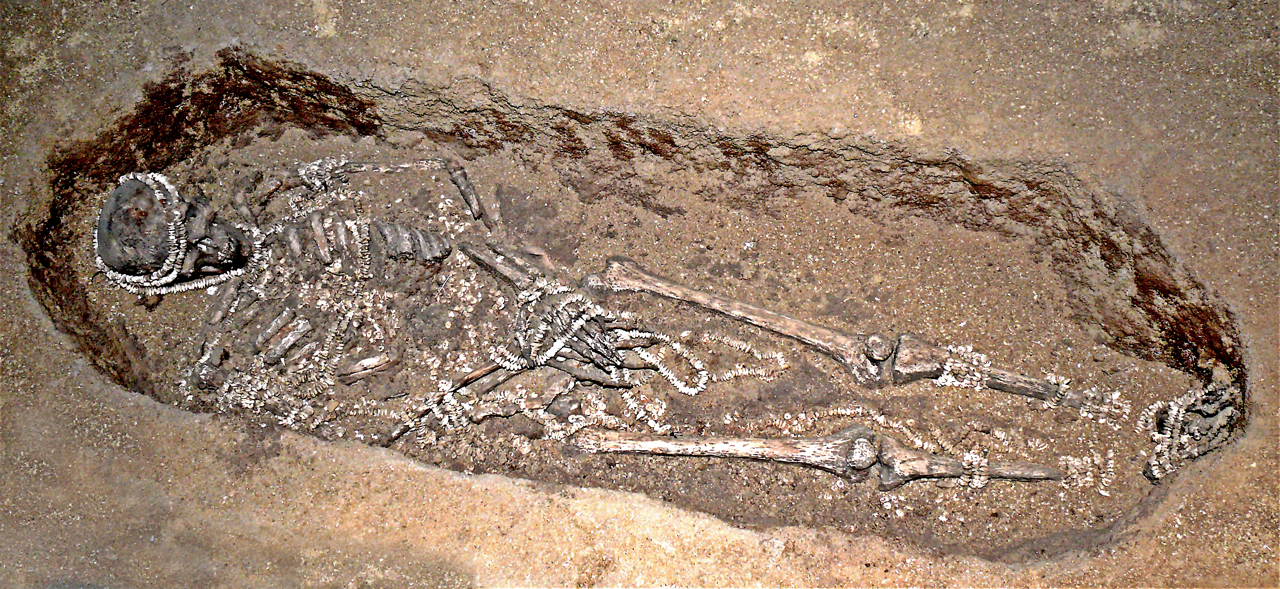
Grave from Sungir

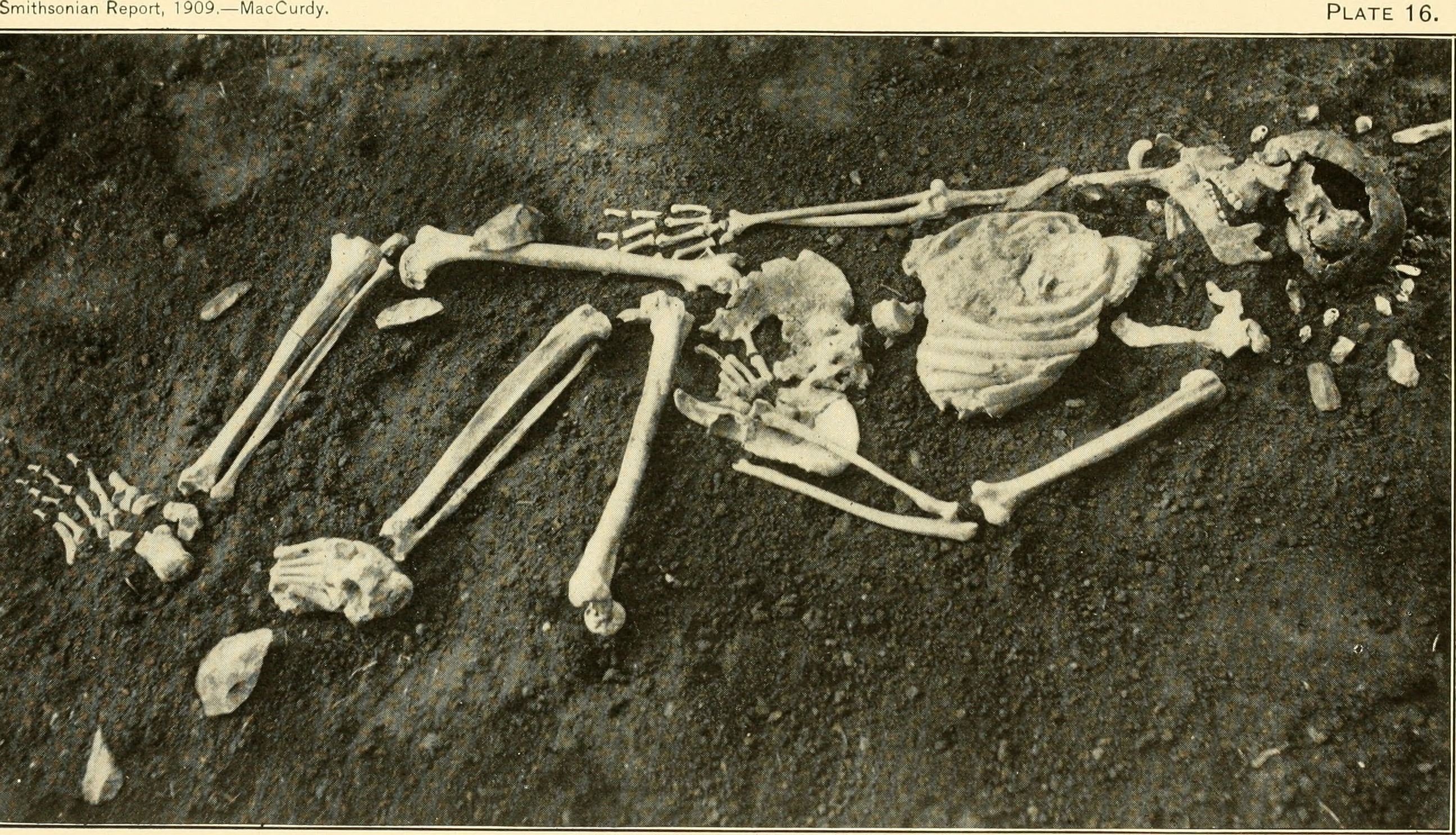
Grave from Combe-Capelle, France

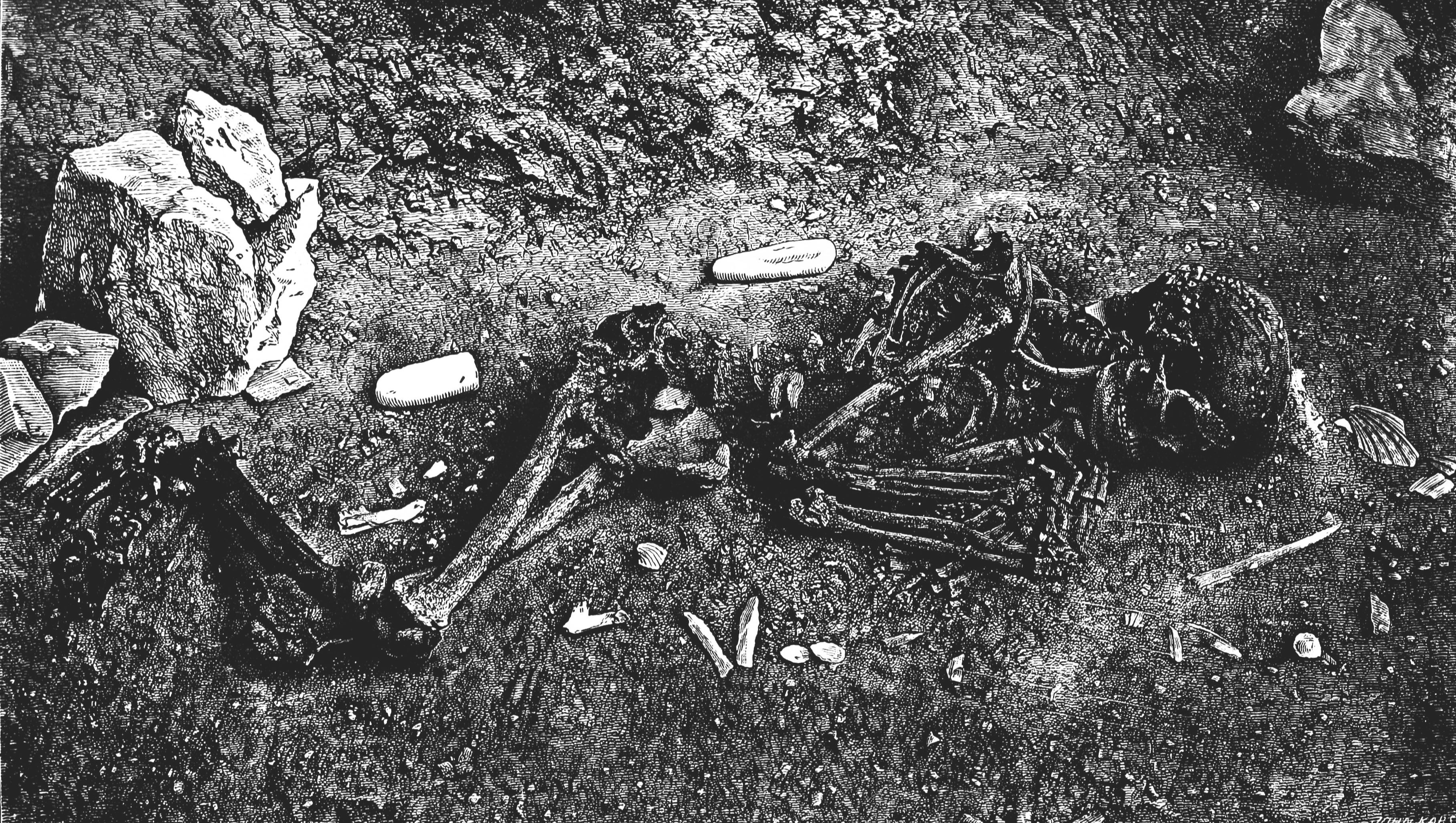
Grave from Menton, France

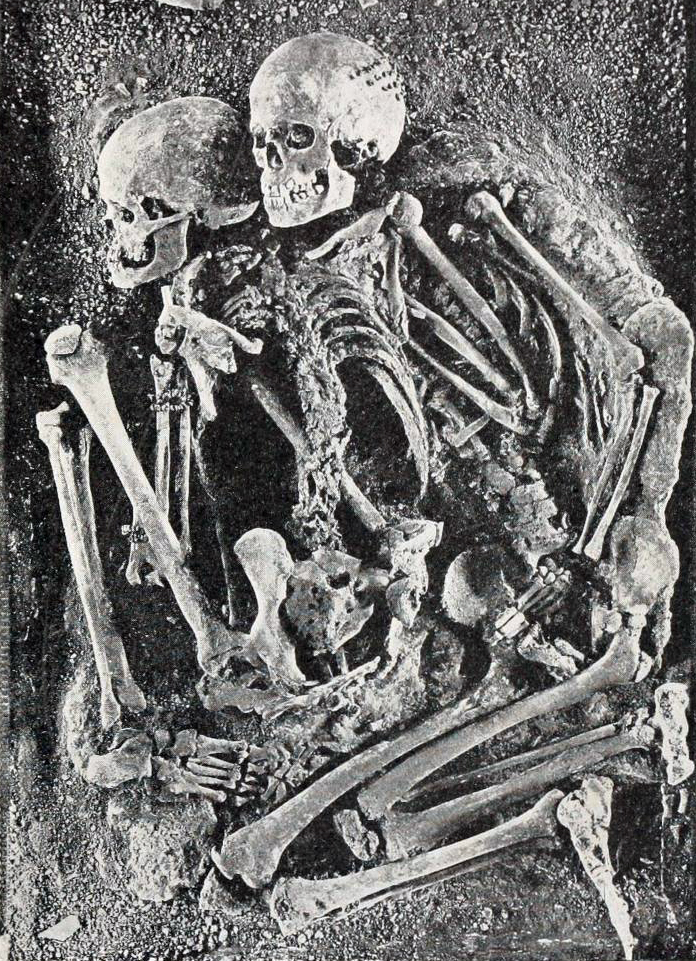
Grave from Grimaldi, Italy

==== Cannibalism ====
The earliest evidence of skull cups, and thus ritual cannibalism, comes from the Magdalenian of Gough's Cave, England. Further concrete evidence of such rituals does not appear until after the Palaeolithic. The Gough's Cave cup seems to have followed a similar method of scalping as those from Neolithic Europe, with incisions being made along the midline of the skull (whereas the Native American method of scalping involved a circular incision around the crown). Earlier examples of non-ritual cannibalism in Europe do not seem to have followed the same method of defleshing. At least 1 skull cup was transported from a different site. In addition, Gough's Cave also yielded a human radius with a zig-zag engraving. Compared to other artefacts in the cave or common to the Magdalenian period, the radius was modified quite little, with the engraving probably quickly etched on (indicated by scrape marks not recorded on any other Magdalenian engraving), and the bone broken and discarded soon thereafter. This may indicate the bone's only function was as a tool in some cannibalistic and/or funerary ritual, rather than being prepared to be carried around by the group as an ornament or tool.

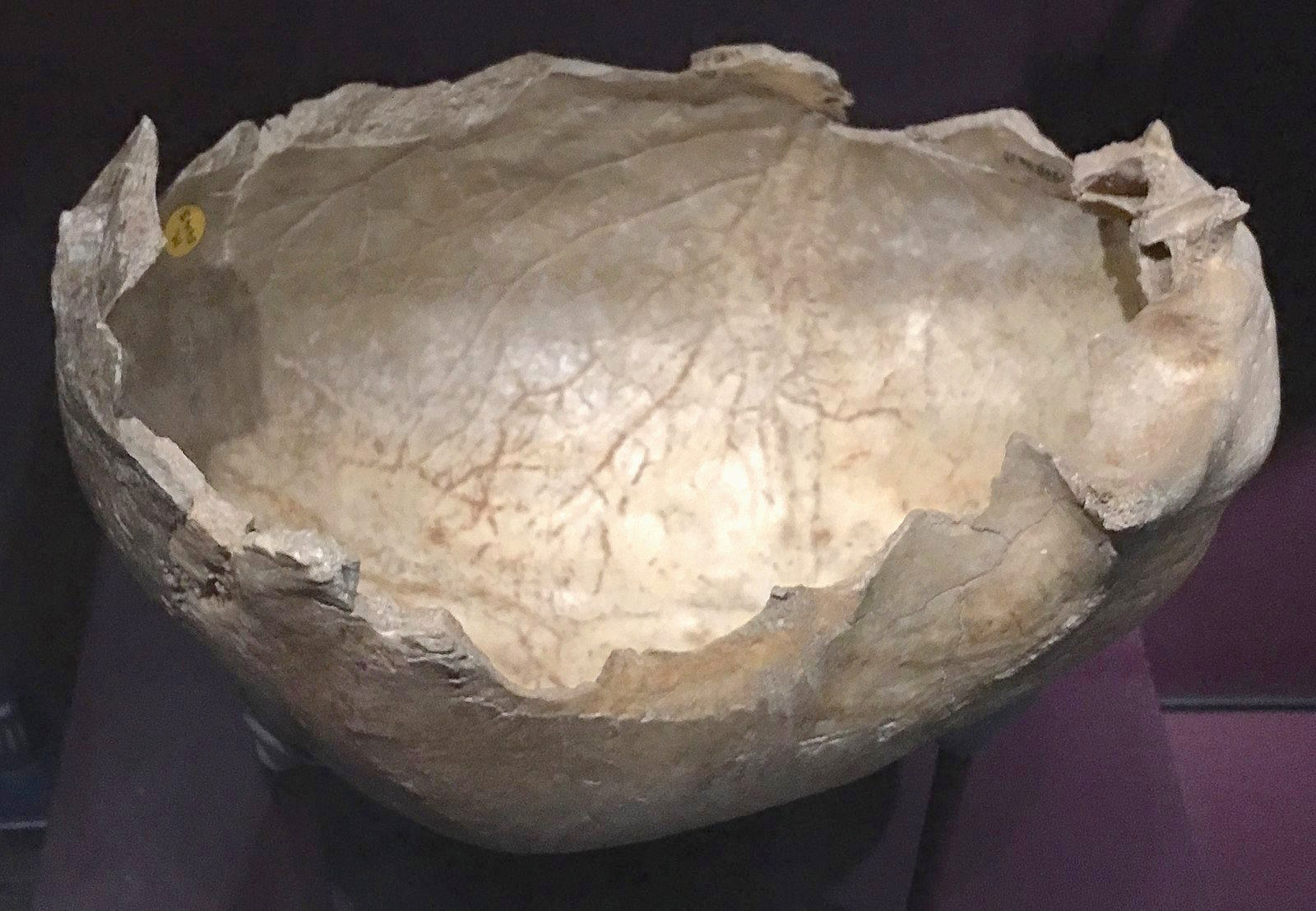
Human skull cup from Gough's Cave, England

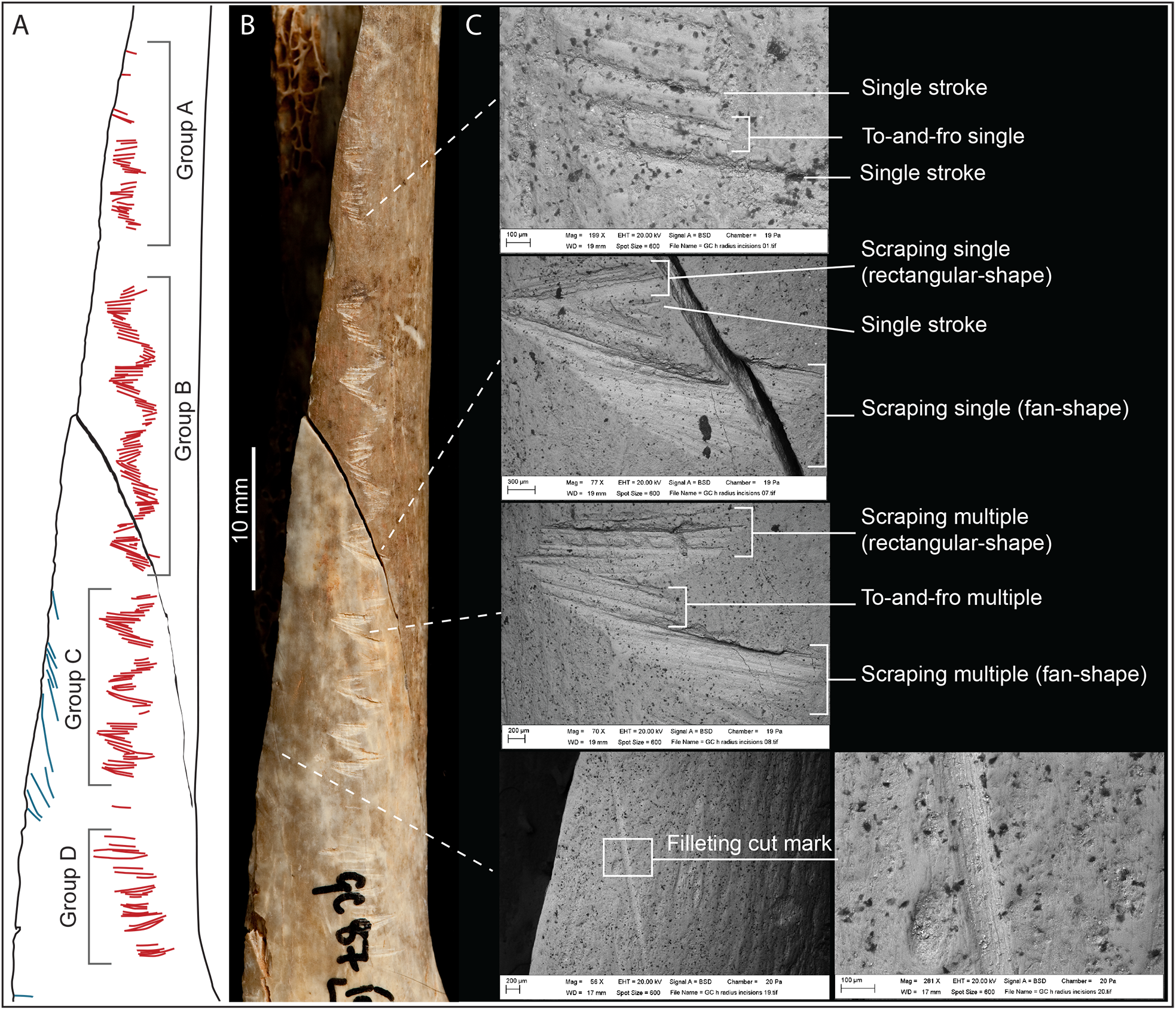
Engraved human radius from Gough's Cave, England

== In media ==
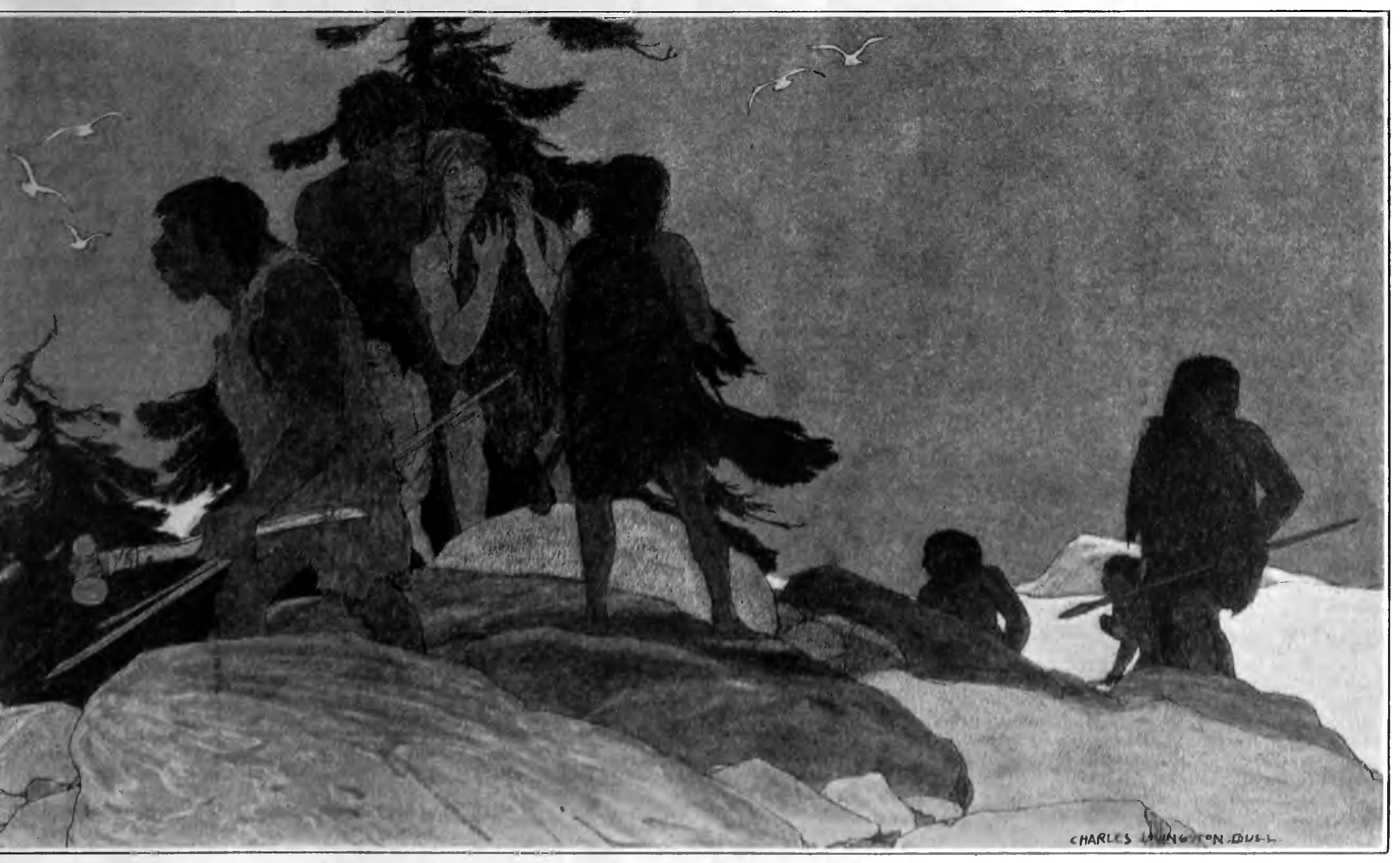
Cro-Magnons tribe in H. G. Wells' The Grisly Folk

The "caveman" archetype is quite popular in both literature and visual media and can be portrayed as highly muscular, hairy, or monstrous, and to represent a wild and animalistic character, drawing on the characteristics of a wild man. Cavemen are often represented in front of a cave or fighting a dangerous animal; wielding stone, bone, or wooden tools usually for combat; and dressed in an exposing fur cloak. Men often are depicted with unkempt, unstyled, shoulder-length or longer hair, usually with a beard. Cavemen first appeared in visual media in D. W. Griffith's 1912 Man's Genesis, and among the first appearances in fictional literature were Stanley Waterloo's 1897 The Story of Ab and Jack London's 1907 Before Adam.

Cavemen have also been popularly portrayed (inaccurately) as confronting dinosaurs, first done in Griffith's 1914 Brute Force (the sequel to Man's Genesis) featuring a Ceratosaurus. Cro-Magnons are also portrayed interacting with Neanderthals, such as in J.-H. Rosny's 1911 Quest for Fire, H. G. Wells' 1927 The Grisly Folk, William Golding's 1955 The Inheritors, Björn Kurtén's 1978 Dance of the Tiger, Jean M. Auel's 1980 Clan of the Cave Bear and her Earth's Children series, and Elizabeth Marshall Thomas' 1987 Reindeer Moon and its 1990 sequel The Animal Wife. Cro-Magnons are generally portrayed as superior in some way to Neanderthals which allowed them to take Europe.

== See also ==
- Châtelperronian – Proposed Upper Paleolithic European industry
- Early modern human – Old Stone Age Homo sapiens
- History of Indigenous Australians – Overview of Indigenous Australian history
- Mal'ta–Buret' culture – Paleolithic archeological culture
- Peopling of the Americas – Prehistoric migration from Asia to the Americas
- Women in prehistory
