= The Clan of the Cave Bear =

1980 novel by Jean M. Auel

- First edition
- Author: Jean M. Auel
- Language: English
- Series: Earth's Children
- Genre: Prehistoric fiction
- Published: May 4, 1980, Crown
- Publication place: United States
- Media type: Print (Hardcover)
- Pages: 468 pp
- ISBN: 0-517-54202-1
- OCLC: 6277166
- Dewey Decimal: 813/.54
- LC Class: PS3551.U36 C57 1980
- Followed by: The Valley of Horses

The Clan of the Cave Bear is a 1980 work of prehistoric fiction by Jean M. Auel. It is the first novel in the Earth's Children book series, which speculates on the possibilities of interactions between Neanderthal and modern Cro-Magnon humans.

== Setting ==
The novel references the advance of the polar ice sheets, setting the story 18,000 years BCE, when the farthest southern encroachment of the last glacial period of the current ice age occurred. Auel's time-frame, sometime between 28,000 and 25,000 BCE, corresponds generally with archaeological estimates of the Neanderthal branch of humankind disappearing.

== Plots ==
A five-year-old girl, Ayla, who readers come to understand is Cro-Magnon, is orphaned and left homeless by an earthquake that destroys her family's camp. She wanders naked and unable to feed herself for several days. She is attacked and nearly killed by a cave lion, and, suffering from starvation, exhaustion, and infection of her wounds, she collapses, on the verge of death.

The narrative switches to a group of people who call themselves "Clan" and who the reader comes to understand are Neanderthal. Their cave was destroyed in the earthquake, and they are searching for a new home. The medicine woman of the group, Iza, discovers Ayla and asks permission from her brother Brun, the Clan leader, to help her, despite the child being clearly a member of "the Others," the distrusted antagonists of the Clan. The child is adopted by Iza and her eldest brother Creb. Creb is the group's "Mog-ur" or shaman, despite being deformed as a result of a difficult birth caused by his abnormally large head, and the later loss of an arm and eye after being attacked by a cave bear. The Clan worships spiritual representations of Earthly animals, called totems, that they believe can influence their lives by sending good or bad luck, and for whom Mog-ur acts as an intermediary. Brun allows Iza to treat the dying child and agrees to adopt her providing Creb can discover her personal totem spirit.

Through meditation, Creb comes to believe that the child may be protected by the spirit of the cave lion, a powerful totem never given to a woman and only to very few men. He cites the cave lion attack the girl experienced shortly before being discovered as proof that its spirit marked her so that she could be adopted into the Clan. The girl travels with them for a while and starts to heal. When the group stops to discuss what they should do since they have not found a new home, Ayla wanders and discovers a huge, beautiful cave, perfect for their needs. Many of the people begin to regard Ayla as lucky, especially since good fortune continues to come their way as she lives among them.

In Auel's books, Neanderthals possess only limited vocal apparatus and rarely speak; however, they have a highly developed sign language. They do not laugh or even smile, and they do not cry; when Ayla weeps, Iza thinks she has an eye disease. They also mature very early, becoming pubescent at around 7–9 years old, with a few maturing at 10 years old; very soon after, they are given a mate and have children. A person in their 20s and 30s is considered old. Iza was considered to have a geriatic pregnancy when she was nearly twenty and had stumbled upon Ayla.

Ayla's different thought processes lead her to break important Clan customs, particularly the taboo against females handling weapons. She is self-willed and spirited, but she tries to fit in with the Neanderthals, although she has to learn everything first-hand; she does not possess the ancestral memories of the Clan that enable them to do certain tasks after being shown only once.

Iza is concerned that when Ayla grows up, nobody will want her as their mate as she is very ugly to the Neaderthal, making her a burden to the group. She therefore trains Ayla as a medicine woman of her line, the most prestigious line of medicine women of the entire Clan. This will give Ayla her own status, independent of whether or not she is mated. It takes Iza much longer to train Ayla than it will her own daughter, Uba, since Ayla does not possess the memories of the Clan.

Ayla's main antagonist in the novel is Broud, son of the leader Brun, who feels that she takes credit and attention away from him. As the two mature, the hatred in Broud's heart festers. When they are young adults, he brutally rapes Ayla in a bid to demonstrate his total control over her; he continues to sexually assault her multiple times a day. She sinks into depression that leaves her despondent and uninterested, and she becomes pregnant soon after at the age of approximately 11 years old. Iza explains to Ayla that her unattractive appearance compared to a Clan woman will likely preclude her from obtaining a mate before she gives birth — a circumstance Iza's people believe will bring the group bad luck. Having dreamed of being a mother for most of her life and convinced that this may be her only chance due to her powerful totem, Ayla refuses Iza's suggestion that she take medicine to abort the child. Following a difficult pregnancy and a near-fatal labor, Ayla rejoices in the birth of her son Durc, but because he has a number of Cro-Magnon features, he is classified by the Clan as deformed and is almost taken away from her, but after much pleading and convincing, Ayla is allowed to stay in the Clan and keep her son Durc.

Iza becomes extremely unwell due to her chronic illness; at her deathbed, she was just past 26 with white hair, gaunt frame and wrinkled skin.

The book ends with Broud's succession of Brun to leadership and Goov's succession of Creb as mog-ur. Broud orders Goov to place an immediate death-curse on Ayla. Another earthquake then happens, killing Creb. Ayla sets off to find other people of her own kind. Durc remains with the tribe under the protection of Brun who admonishes Broud and regrets his decision to make him leader.

== Sequels ==
The sequel, The Valley of Horses, continues Ayla's story, which is further developed in the four other books of the Earth's Children series: The Mammoth Hunters, The Plains of Passage, The Shelters of Stone, and The Land of Painted Caves.

== Background ==
The archaeological and paleontological research for this book was carried out by Auel from her public library, by attending archaeological conventions, and touring extensively on sites with briefings by working field archaeologists. Some of the descriptions are based on the first adult Neanderthal skeletons found in Iraq from the cave burial at Shanidar, dating between 60–80,000 years BP. Other data is clearly linked to the widespread Aurignacian culture and Gravettian culture, and their tell-tale Venus figurines, which Auel uses as one center of her Cro-Magnon religious practices.

== Film and television adaptations ==
In 1986, the novel was adapted into a film directed by Michael Chapman and starring Daryl Hannah.

In 2014, the Lifetime television network ordered a pilot episode, based on the series of novels. Ron Howard, Brian Grazer, Jean M. Auel, and Linda Woolverton are executive producers, with Woolverton writing the teleplay. The launch was slated for some time in 2015.

Despite reports of plans to shoot a pilot for a series to have started in 2016, with Ireland as one location, this plan was canceled by Lifetime and has been shopped around to various networks with no luck. It is presumed to be dead, as of March 2016.

== See also ==
- The Clan of the Cave Bear (film)
- Earth's Children (novel series)
- Use of animals during the Gravettian period
- Aurignacian culture
- Gravettian culture
- Neanderthal extinction hypotheses
- The Inheritors
- Venus figurines
