= List of The New York Times number-one books of 1990 =

The American daily newspaper The New York Times publishes multiple weekly lists ranking the best selling books in the United States.

== Fiction ==
The following list ranks the number-one best selling fiction books, in the hardcover fiction category.

Date	Book	Author
January 7	The Dark Half	Stephen King
January 14	The Dark Half	Stephen King
January 21	Daddy	Danielle Steel
January 28	Daddy	Danielle Steel
February 4	The Bad Place	Dean Koontz
February 11	The Bad Place	Dean Koontz
February 18	Devices and Desires	P. D. James
February 25	Devices and Desires	P. D. James
March 4	Oh, the Places You'll Go!	Dr. Seuss
March 11	Devices and Desires	P. D. James
March 18	The Bourne Ultimatum	Robert Ludlum
March 25	The Bourne Ultimatum	Robert Ludlum
April 1	The Bourne Ultimatum	Robert Ludlum
April 8	The Bourne Ultimatum	Robert Ludlum
April 15	The Bourne Ultimatum	Robert Ludlum
April 22	September	Rosamunde Pilcher
April 29	September	Rosamunde Pilcher
May 6	September	Rosamunde Pilcher
May 13	The Stand	Stephen King
May 20	The Stand	Stephen King
May 27	September	Rosamunde Pilcher
June 3	The Stand	Stephen King
June 10	The Stand	Stephen King
June 17	The Burden of Proof	Scott Turow
June 24	The Burden of Proof	Scott Turow
July 1	The Burden of Proof	Scott Turow
July 8	The Burden of Proof	Scott Turow
July 15	The Burden of Proof	Scott Turow
July 22	The Burden of Proof	Scott Turow
July 29	The Burden of Proof	Scott Turow
August 5	The Burden of Proof	Scott Turow
August 12	The Burden of Proof	Scott Turow
August 19	The Burden of Proof	Scott Turow
August 26	The Burden of Proof	Scott Turow
September 2	Memories of Midnight	Sidney Sheldon
September 9	Memories of Midnight	Sidney Sheldon
September 16	Four Past Midnight	Stephen King
September 23	Four Past Midnight	Stephen King
September 30	Four Past Midnight	Stephen King
October 7	Four Past Midnight	Stephen King
October 14	Four Past Midnight	Stephen King
October 21	The Plains of Passage	Jean M. Auel
October 28	The Plains of Passage	Jean M. Auel
November 4	The Plains of Passage	Jean M. Auel
November 11	The Plains of Passage	Jean M. Auel
November 18	The Plains of Passage	Jean M. Auel
November 25	The Plains of Passage	Jean M. Auel
December 2	The Plains of Passage	Jean M. Auel
December 9	The Plains of Passage	Jean M. Auel
December 16	The Plains of Passage	Jean M. Auel
December 23	The Plains of Passage	Jean M. Auel
December 30	The Plains of Passage	Jean M. Auel

== Nonfiction ==
The following list ranks the number-one best selling nonfiction books, in the hardcover nonfiction category.

Date	Book	Author
January 7	It Was On Fire When I Lay Down On It	Robert Fulghum
January 14	It Was On Fire When I Lay Down On It	Robert Fulghum
January 21	It Was On Fire When I Lay Down On It	Robert Fulghum
January 28	Liar's Poker	Michael Lewis
February 4	Megatrends 2000	John Naisbitt and Patricia Aburdene
February 11	Megatrends 2000	John Naisbitt and Patricia Aburdene
February 18
February 25
March 4
March 11	Barbarians at the Gate	Bryan Burrough and John Helyar
March 18	Megatrends 2000	John Naisbitt and Patricia Aburdene
March 25	Megatrends 2000	John Naisbitt and Patricia Aburdene
April 1	Megatrends 2000	John Naisbitt and Patricia Aburdene
April 8	Means of Ascent	Robert A. Caro
April 15	Megatrends 2000	John Naisbitt and Patricia Aburdene
April 22	Means of Ascent	Robert A. Caro
April 29	Men at Work	George F. Will
May 6	Men at Work	George F. Will
May 13	Men at Work	George F. Will
May 20	Men at Work	George F. Will
May 27	Men at Work	George F. Will
June 3	Men at Work	George F. Will
June 10	Men at Work	George F. Will
June 17	Men at Work	George F. Will
June 24	Men at Work	George F. Will
July 1	Men at Work	George F. Will
July 8	Men at Work	George F. Will
July 15	Men at Work	George F. Will
July 22	Men at Work	George F. Will
July 29	Men at Work	George F. Will
August 5	Men at Work	George F. Will
August 12	Men at Work	George F. Will
August 19	Men at Work	George F. Will
August 26	Men at Work	George F. Will
September 2	Men at Work	George F. Will
September 9	Trump: Surviving at the Top	Donald Trump with Charles Leerhsen
September 16	Darkness Visible	William Styron
September 23	Trump: Surviving at the Top	Donald Trump with Charles Leerhsen
September 30	Millie's Book	as dictated to Barbara Bush
October 7	By Way of Deception	Victor Ostrovsky and Claire Hoy
October 14	By Way of Deception	Victor Ostrovsky and Claire Hoy
October 21	By Way of Deception	Victor Ostrovsky and Claire Hoy
October 28	By Way of Deception	Victor Ostrovsky and Claire Hoy
November 4	By Way of Deception	Victor Ostrovsky and Claire Hoy
November 11	The Civil War	Geoffrey C. Ward with Ric Burns and Ken Burns
November 18	The Civil War	Geoffrey C. Ward with Ric Burns and Ken Burns
November 25	The Civil War	Geoffrey C. Ward with Ric Burns and Ken Burns
December 2	A Life on the Road	Charles Kuralt
December 9	A Life on the Road	Charles Kuralt
December 16	A Life on the Road	Charles Kuralt
December 23	A Life on the Road	Charles Kuralt
December 30	A Life on the Road	Charles Kuralt

== See also ==
- Publishers Weekly list of bestselling novels in the United States in the 1990s
