= Earth's Children =

1980–2011 series of books by Jean M. Auel

- Volumes: The Clan of the Cave Bear; The Valley of Horses; The Mammoth Hunters; The Plains of Passage; The Shelters of Stone; The Land of Painted Caves
- Author: Jean M. Auel
- Country: United States
- Language: English
- Genre: epic novel historical fiction speculative fiction
- Published: 1980–2011
- Media type: Print (hardback & paperback)

Earth's Children is a series of epic historical fiction (or more precisely, prehistorical fiction) novels written by Jean M. Auel set circa 30,000 years before the present day. There are six novels in the series. Although Auel had previously mentioned in interviews that there would be a seventh novel, publicity announcements for the sixth confirmed that it would be the final book in the sequence.

The series is set in Europe during the Upper Paleolithic era, after the date of the first ceramics discovered, but before the last advance of glaciers. The books focus on the period of co-existence between Cro-Magnons and Neanderthals.

As a whole, the series is a tale of personal discovery: coming-of-age, invention, cultural complexities, and, beginning with the second book, explicit romantic sex. It tells the story of Ayla, an orphaned Cro-Magnon girl who is adopted and raised by a tribe of Neanderthals who call themselves "the Clan". In early adulthood, she is given a "death curse," by the new leader who hates her. She is forced to leave behind her toddler son, a Neanderthal and Cro-Magnon mix, in search of people like her. She spends years living alone in a cave as she searches for the Cro-Magnon people she has been told live north of the peninsula on which she was raised, who are called "the Others" by the Neanderthals. Along the way she meets her romantic interest and supporting co-protagonist, Jondalar.

The story arc in part comprises a travel tale, in which the two lovers journey from the region of what will be Ukraine to Jondalar's home in what is now France, along an indirect route up the Danube River valley. In the third and fourth works, they meet various groups of Cro-Magnons and encounter their culture and technology. The couple finally return to Jondalar's people in the fifth novel. The series includes a highly detailed focus on botany, herbology and herbal medicine, archaeology, and anthropology, but it also features substantial amounts of romance, coming-of-age crises, and—employing significant literary license—the attribution of certain advances and inventions to the protagonists.

In addition, Auel's series incorporates a number of recent archeological and anthropological theories. It also suggested the notion of Sapiens-Neanderthal interbreeding.

The author's treatment of unconventional sexual practices (which are central to her hypothesized nature-centered religions) and frequent explicit depictions of sex has earned the series a top twenty place on the American Library Association's list of the 100 Most Frequently Challenged Books of 1990–1999.

== Books ==
=== The Clan of the Cave Bear ===
The first book, The Clan of the Cave Bear, was released in September 1980 and is a story of personal development set in pre-historic southern Europe during the current ice age but before the Last Glacial Maximum. It introduces the reader to a wide variety of diverse topics, including herbal medicine and anthropological-archeological reasoning. The book introduces Ayla, a young girl belonging to the titular clan who looks nothing like her peers, especially with her long, golden hair.

=== The Valley of Horses ===
The Valley of Horses was released in September 1982. Ayla, cast out of the Clan, has been forced to follow the advice given her in the first book by her dying foster-mother Iza. She goes in search of the Others—that is, people like herself: European Cro-Magnon Homo sapiens, or early-modern humans, returned west and north to Europe after an incubation period of tens of millennia in the Near and Far East.

=== The Mammoth Hunters ===
The third book in the series, The Mammoth Hunters, was released in fall 1985. It details Ayla's personal growth as she learns to cope with a society of widely disparate individuals and their unpredictable behaviors, mysterious motivations, and habits.

=== The Plains of Passage ===
The Plains of Passage was released in November 1990. Ayla and Jondalar travel west, back to Zelandonii territory, encountering dangers from both nature and humans along the way. Her interactions often force the people around her to take a broader view and be more accepting of new ideas.

=== The Shelters of Stone ===
The Shelters of Stone was released on 30 April 2002. Ayla and Jondalar reach the Ninth Cave of the Zelandonii, Jondalar's home, and prepare to marry and have a child. Unfortunately, nothing is ever simple, especially for a woman with Ayla's background.

=== The Land of Painted Caves ===
The Land of Painted Caves, the sixth and final installment in the series, was published on March 29, 2011. Author Jean M. Auel is quoted in September 2010 saying that in this book, Ayla is about 25 years old and training to become a spiritual leader of the Zelandonii which includes a series of harrowing journeys.

== Premise ==
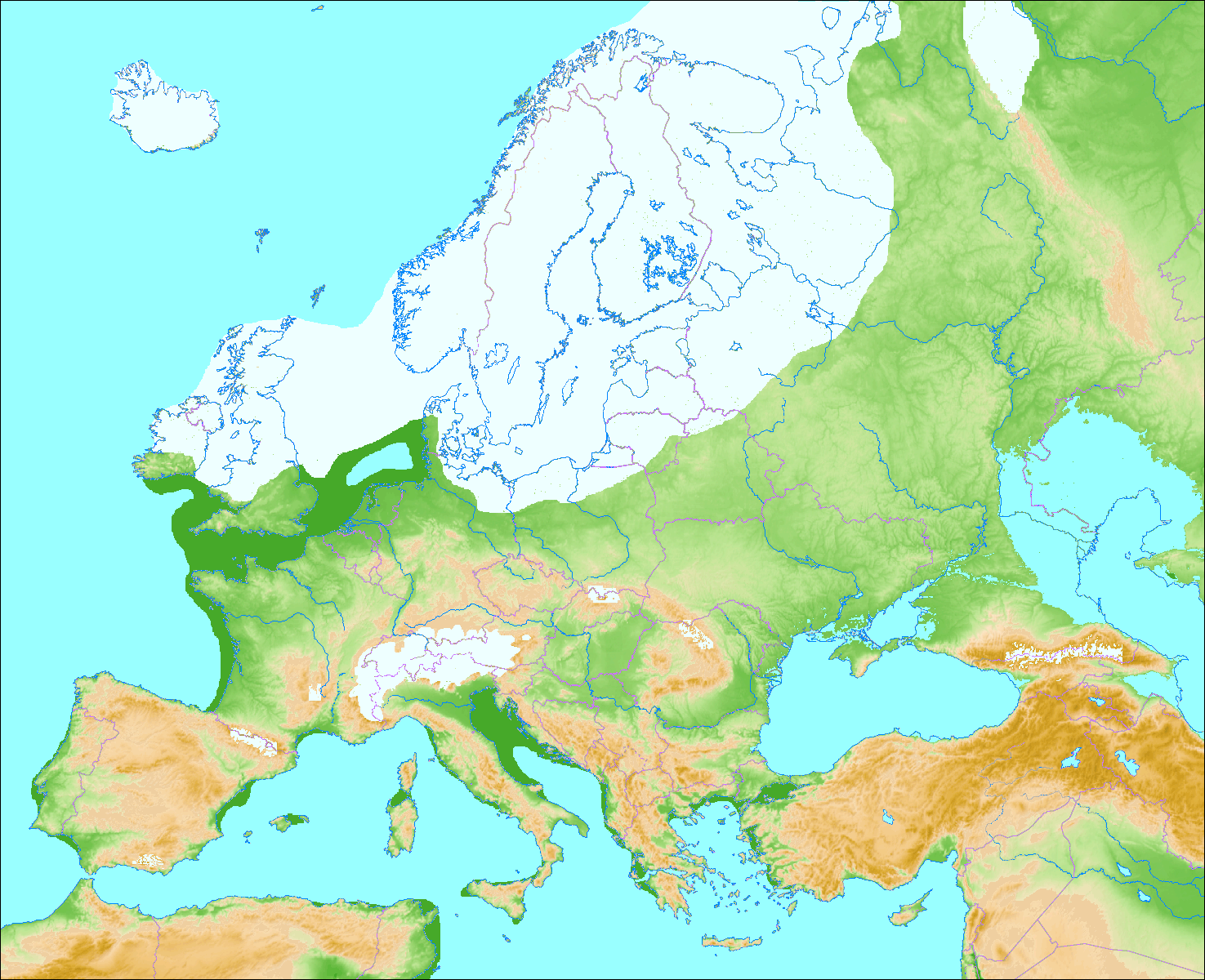
Map of Europe during the Würm glaciation (30000 BC).

Since the stories take place during the Würm glaciation, populations are small in number and are surviving mostly in hunter-gatherer fashion. Prior to the discovery of metals, the primary materials used for tools are leather, wood, bone, horn, and flint.

=== People ===
In Auel's series, two cultures vie for resources, space, and survival: the Clan, which is what Neanderthals call themselves, and the Cro-Magnons (whom Ayla, with her Clan upbringing, generally refers to as "The Others"). The races are fairly different in culture, society and technology, but with some overlap: both depend on flint for their tools; both recognize the importance of fire and use it; both hunt and gather.

Physiologically, the Clan are heavier and broader but also shorter than the people of The Others. They are very slow to embrace change and to innovate, and they still chase after animals to spear them directly, whereas the Cro-Magnons are enthusiastic about innovation and have moved on to projectile spears. The Clan's tools, clothing, and household implements are similarly less refined and sometimes less effective than those of their Cro-Magnon counterparts, whose implements and other goods are more technologically sophisticated.

The Clan's reluctance to change is depicted by Auel as a function of their cognition; they are presented as dependent upon their racial-genetic memory. The average Clan child needs only be 'reminded' of a thing to know it permanently, though skilled tasks still require repetitive practice. Furthermore, the need to encode everything into a child's brain has increased the average Neanderthal head size to the point that, by the time of the first novel, women of the Clan are having trouble giving birth to their large-headed babies—a sign that their evolutionary strategy has run its course.

The "Flatheads", as "The Others" pejoratively call the Neanderthals (owing to their distinctive back-sloping foreheads), also have a far more limited vocal repertoire than The Others, and largely communicate instead via a gestural sign language, although spoken words are sometimes used to add emphasis to the gestures. Auel describes this language as being quite nuanced, especially as bodily posture, facial expression and other physical actions — in short, body language — can expedite and expand upon the basic vocabulary of the hand signals. A Cro-Magnon observing Ayla demonstrating a translation characterizes the language as dancelike and elegant.

For this reason, Clan members are highly adept at reading body language and cannot be deceived by lying; while one can spell an untruth with one's hands, one's posture will give it away. Consequently, the idea of telling an untruth is alien to Clan culture, a fact that Ayla needs time to conceptualize and understand. However, a Clan member can "refrain from mentioning" something she would prefer other people did not know, even though residual clues would probably reveal that something was being concealed. Cultural conventions, Auel suggests, would cause other Clan members to ignore the concealment out of sheer courtesy, though, again, Ayla has trouble grasping this concept.

Finally, the wider Clan possesses not only a colloquial, everyday "localized" language, but also a more formal "ancient" or "spirit language," used to converse with ancestors and understood by every Clan member, anywhere. This language facilitates easy communication at inter-regional meetings of normally separated groups and does not require the multilingualism that the Others must acquire. This "spirit language" has no spoken words apart from personal names, and its users generally refer to themselves in the third person.

In Auel's context, our human ancestors, the Cro-Magnon "Others," generally look upon the "Flatheads" as animals, hardly better than bears (the lack of vocal language is a primary factor in this verdict). The Clan, for their part, seem to have no strong opinions about the Others other than considering their spoken language as babbling and a sign of their lack of intellect. Otherwise, they have concluded it is best simply to avoid the Cro-Magnon men.

Accurate to current DNA evidence, Auel depicts Cro-Magnons and Neanderthals as able to interbreed. The mixed-race children are generally not favorably regarded by either group. As in many historical cultures, malformed Clan children are routinely subjected to exposure, while the Others may allow such children to live but prejudicially label them as 'abominations'. Such children and their experiences enter the plotline in several books of the series.

"Children of mixed spirits", as the Cro-Magnons call them, are mis-matched combinations of both Cro-Magnon and Neanderthal phenotypes physiologically as they are genetic hybrids, with some traits (like facial features) appearing blurred or distorted when compared side-by-side. Of the five mixed-race people depicted in the series, only one has had the restricted vocal range of the Clan (Rydag, from The Mammoth Hunters), and all but one has been seen using Clan sign language, the sole exception being the difficult and disconsolate self-loathing Brukeval (who is in clear psychological denial about his ancestry), in The Shelters of Stone. The vocal range of one of the mixed-race persons is as of yet unknown because she was only a baby when we meet her in The Clan of the Cave Bear.

=== Organization ===
"The Clan" is an overarching term; every Neanderthal is a member of the Clan. Organizationally, they live in smaller tribes, also called "clans" but named after the man who leads them; for instance, Ayla is adopted into Brun's clan. Later, when Brun steps down and, as is traditional, passes leadership of the clan on to the son of his mate, it becomes known as Broud's clan. Every seven years, Clans from the immediate area meet in a Clan Gathering; the only one Auel has depicted consisted of approximately 250 people. The Clan is mostly patriarchal: women cannot hunt, make hunting tools, lead a Clan or become a Mog-ur (a spiritual leader or shaman). But men cannot become medicine women, a job that is almost as prestigious as clan leader. Unlike other women, whose status depends on the status of their mates, a medicine woman has status in her own right and can, if her line is illustrious enough, even outrank the leader's mate.

"The Earth Children" is an overarching term; their primary allegiances are to their people and their caves. Each culture has a name for itself (Zelandonii, for instance, means "Children of the Great Earth Mother who live in the Southwest") and may subdivide into smaller Caves or Camps (the Twenty-Ninth Cave of the Zelandonii, the Lion Camp of the Mamutoi). Curiously, however, most Other culture names includes their word for Great Earth Mother: Doni in Zelandonii, Mut in Mamutoi ("Children of the Great Earth Mother who hunt Mammoths"), Gaea in Sungaea (translation unknown), etc. Their culture is far more egalitarian, with different twists and customs at every hand; Mamutoi Camps, for instance, are co-ruled by headmen and headwomen who are biological, or adoptive, siblings, and the Sharamudoi, a people that lives half-on and -off the Great Mother River, form complex co-mate systems between river couples (Ramudoi) and land couples (Shamudoi). Each entire people generally gathers for Summer Meetings every year, during which a number of important ceremonies, such as the Matrimonial, take place.

=== Religion ===
The Clan worships animal spirits, most notably Ursus the Cave Bear, for, as is related in one of the best known Clan legends, it was the Spirit of the Great Cave Bear that taught the Clan to wear fur, live in caves, and store up reserves during the seasons of abundance in order to survive the winter. The honoring of Ursus is what binds the Clan together as a people, and it is for this reason that the Bear Ceremony, and Feast of Ursus which follows it, held at the Clan Gathering are the highest religious rituals of the Clan. As described in Chapter 22 of Clan of the Cave Bear when Brun's clan chanced to see a living cave bear on their way to the Clan Gathering, "But it was more than the tremendous size of the animal that held the clan spellbound. This was Ursus, the personification of the Clan itself. He was their kin, and more, he embodied their very essence. His bones alone were so sacred they could ward off any evil. The kinship they felt was a spiritual tie, far more meaningful than any physical one. It was through his spirit that all clans were united into one and meaning was given to the Gathering they had traveled so far to attend. It was his essence that made them Clan, the Clan of the Cave Bear."

The Clan's animal spirits are always male. However, in the early days of the Clan, weather spirits such as Wind and Rain—spirits whose worship is so ancient that Creb had to use deep meditation to find them in the Clan memories—bore female names. Goov, Creb's apprentice, also speculates that Ayla's totem may be the Cave Lioness, rather than the Cave Lion, although this would be unprecedented in the Clan.

In the ancient days when the weather spirits were honored, roles within the Clan had not yet become so markedly differentiated by sex—for example, women still hunted alongside the men when they didn't have little children who needed their care. At this time, women were also the ones in charge of the spiritual life of the Clan. Because they once controlled access to the spirit world, and because the ceremonies involved begging the Clan spirits in what could be considered an unmanly fashion, Clan tradition holds that should a woman see one of the men's religious ceremonies, the clan in which this occurred would suffer disaster. When a ceremony invoking the weather spirits is held to sanction Ayla's hunting, especially strong protection was required for the men, both to guard against the presence of a female at the ceremony and because the ancient spirits were feared as much as they were honored in the days when they were worshiped. Ayla's subsequent accidental observation of one of the highest ceremonies at the Clan Gathering is interpreted by Creb to foretell doom for the entire Clan of the Cave Bear, as those ceremonies have meaning for all the clans of the Clan, even those not present at the Gathering.

All Clan members are assigned a totem at birth, and boys are marked with that totem's ritual tattoo as part of the ceremony that marks their passage from child to man following their first major hunting kill. People are also believed to possess personality traits similar to those of their totem spirit; Broud, quick-tempered, stubborn and unpredictable like a woolly rhinoceros (his totem spirit) is a prime example. Totems are also responsible for pregnancy; a woman's moon time is believed to be her totem fighting off the presences of marauding male totems; for this reason, women's totems are almost invariably weaker than those of men and women may not associate with men during menstruation. Should the male totem prove stronger, the woman will become pregnant. If the totem is not strong enough by itself, it may ask for the help of one or more other totems, in which case it may be one of the other totems that leaves behind an impregnating essence. It is considered especially lucky for a boy to have the same totem as the mate of his mother. Totems are assigned by Mog-urs, men whose talent is understanding the world of spirits. Each individual Clan has its own Mog-ur, but one - the one in the clan which Ayla joins - is traditionally recognized as being first among them.

The Clan also believe that, if someone survives a cave bear attack, it means that person is now under the protection of Ursus and may claim the Cave Bear as their totem, in addition to the totem they were assigned in early childhood. Unlike other Clan totems, there is no specific mark for the Cave Bear and the Cave Bear is believed not to play a role in the conception, although it may be called on to help subdue a woman's unusually strong totem. In "Clan of the Cave Bear", two people, Creb and a man injured by a cave bear at a Clan Gathering, are described as being "chosen" in this way.

The Others worship the Great Earth Mother, and to some extent the Moon, her Fair Celestial Mate. The Great Earth Mother goes by many names, depending on the language, but is worshipped unconditionally as the source of all bounty, and carved depictions of her proliferate. Faith and guidance are administered by spiritual leaders of both sexes, with different names depending on the language. Among most of the peoples described, Those Who Serve abandon their personal names in favor of the name of their people and god. (The Mamutoi are the only depicted exception so far: only the Mamut of the Lion Camp, who is first amongst his priesthood due to his age and spiritual power, no longer uses any name but Mamut—mostly because no one remembers his original name!) To avoid confusion, among the Zelandonii they generally take appendices after their cave (e.g. Zelandoni of the Ninth Cave, First Acolyte to the Zelandonii of the Second Cave, etc.), leading Ayla to muse that they have traded their names for counting words, i.e. numbers. As with the Clan, one among Those Who Serve is generally acknowledged (or elected) First.

=== Sex and reproduction ===
Whether accurately or not, Auel has incorporated sex into her prehistoric culture in a number of unique ways. While neither Clan nor Other society requires monogamy, a major difference is that in the former, sex can be treated as a purely physical need, whereas in the latter, it is always imbued with something of the sacred. For the Others, nothing is more abhorrent than the idea of sex without consent, and sexual rituals form a significant part of their culture.

Among the Clan, there exists a hand sign that only men can make and only women can receive, instructing the female in question to present for sexual intercourse. Any man of the Clan (a male who has made his first hunting kill) may give this instruction to any woman of the Clan (a female who has passed menarche), should he feel the need to "relieve his needs," regardless of marital status. (The female's state of arousal is never addressed directly, but since Clan women are able to flirt with men using seductive and inviting body language, enjoyment of the act is not unknown.) Because the Clan believes babies are created by the Totems and have no concept of any connection between copulation and conception, lines of descent are matrilineal, but any children a man's mate bears are considered his heirs (especially in regards to the son of the leader's mate becoming the future leader), and he is expected to provide for her family and train her sons to hunt. Who is mated to whom is decided solely by the men, though wise leaders do of course take the prospective bride's feelings into account; the few Clans depicted average less than fifty members, and even one discordant pairing can cause trouble.

Sexual maturity is the subject of semi-religious customs among the Others, both of which take place at Summer Meetings. Every year, women volunteer to become sexual tutors to boys who have reached maturity; the name of their office changes from culture to culture, but they are generally furnished with some distinguishing marking, often the Mother's sacred color red (red dye on the soles of the feet for the Mamutoi; a red fringe among the Zelandonii). These women are often pregnant by the end of the summer, which is believed to be the Great Earth Mother smiling upon their piety. Young women who have reached menarche, on the other hand, are the subject of a far more formal ceremony called First Rites, in which she is ritually deflowered by a man (often specially chosen by her friends and family). Both these relationships are meant to be solely physical, and social contact between the involved parties is frowned upon for at least a year afterwards. Finally, during "Mother Festivals" which take place at various times of the year, men and women are free to copulate with whomever they choose. Once again, these polygamous practices blur the lines of heredity, and descent is generally traced only through one's mother. However, certain familial resemblances have been noticed (for instance, Jondalar looks almost identical to Dalanar, his mother's spouse at the time of Jondalar's conception), which has led to the belief that the Great Earth Mother chooses the "spirit" or "essence" of a nearby man to impregnate the woman with. Ayla's more accurate belief that children are the result of sexual activity is treated with skepticism among the Others: their women are seldom celibate, which makes the connection between sex and pregnancy harder to isolate.

Homosexual relationships are portrayed as acceptable, if rare. The Zelandonii religious order features at least one homosexual male with a male partner. A Mamutoi clan leader is openly bisexual. Many shamans are also portrayed as what would now be called third gender or non-binary, along with Mamut's mention of a Sungaea who in our modern terms is a trans woman.

== Reception ==
The Earth's Children series has sold 48 million copies worldwide as of 2025, with The Clan of the Cave Bear selling six million in North America. It has also received the following accolades:

- The Clan of the Cave Bear - National Book Award Finalist for First Novel (1981)
- The Shelters of Stone - Publieksprijs voor het Nederlandse Boek Nominee (2002)

Despite the above, the Earth's Children series was the nineteenth most banned and challenged book in the United States between 1990 and 1999.

== Adaptations ==
The Clan of the Cave Bear received a 1986 film adaptation from Warner Bros., directed by Michael Chapman and starring Daryl Hannah. A twelve-episode animated series based on Auel's books entered development in November 2025, with Liane-Cho Han's Pilepse Production as the studio.
