= Ayla (Earth's Children) =

Fictional character by Jean Auel

Ayla is the main character of Jean Auel's Earth's Children novels, a series which started in 1980. She is a woman of unknown origins, simply referred to as one of 'the Others', though possibly a Cro-Magnon woman who was raised by Neanderthals. Her blonde hair and light blue-grey eyes, which would be a much later evolution in the homo-sapiens species, suggests that she comes from a hitherto unknown species, and that her son was possibly the first Homo-Sapiens (and thus Cro-Magnon). Ayla was played by Daryl Hannah as the older version and by Nicole Eggert as the younger version in the 1986 film The Clan of the Cave Bear. Ayla's character has been described as an example of the "rebellious primordial" that conquers adversity with wit and will.

== Background ==
Ayla is orphaned as a young Cro-Magnon child after an earthquake opens a fissure in the ground, directly underneath her and her mother's campsite, brutally taking the mother (and all of her tools and survival essentials) underground to her death. It was mentioned a few times that the location of the camp was odd, and not near any other known Cro-Magnon settlements.

Ayla becomes conscious beside a river adjacent to the campsite after the earthquake; she watches as her mother is helplessly pulled into the depths of the Earth's crust, along with all of their belongings. Wandering aimlessly, alone, frightened, hungry and helpless, Ayla eventually stumbles upon a cave lion, which chases her, forcing her to retreat into a narrow crack in a rock wall. Attempting to pull her out, the lion's claws gash open Ayla's leg, leaving four deep, parallel scratches on her thigh. The girl remains in the tiny space for a day, injured and terrified. Driven by thirst and hunger Ayla emerges from her hiding place to drink at a nearby stream, where she subsequently faints and collapses. Alone and bewildered, she is unsure what to do. Having witnessed the loss of all she knew, attacked by a cave lion, and in need of food and water, she wanders aimlessly near the stream close to death. She is found unconscious by a group of Neanderthals who also lost their home from the earthquake, a small group ("clan") of people unlike her own, led by Brun; Ayla is adopted by Iza, the clan's medicine-woman, and her brother, Creb, the clan's "Mog-ur" (shaman). Though no one knows Ayla's age, the author places Ayla at the age of five years in the book's second paragraph.

See The Clan of the Cave Bear, The Valley of Horses, The Mammoth Hunters, The Plains of Passage, The Shelters of Stone and The Land of Painted Caves for a detailed synopsis of Ayla's life.

== Characteristics ==
As a young woman, Ayla is described as tall, with blonde hair, gray-blue eyes, a strong muscular body, with a high forehead compared to the people who raise her. She was raised with Clan customs, using sign language instead of speech, taught not to laugh, smile or cry, things the Clan people did or could not do. Almost every male Cro-Magnon character in the series finds Ayla exceptionally beautiful. Ayla describes herself as "big and ugly" because she was regarded by the Clan as too tall with different facial features than them, which they found unattractive and strange. Another word frequently used to describe her is 'exotic', indicating that she is foreign in appearance from everyone who meets her, and that her own people live somewhere far away from the Others she eventually meets in her travels.

One of Ayla's most important insights is the concept that men have something to do with the conception of children. Clan people believe that pregnancy and birth are a matter of spirit totems competing; when a woman menstruates, it means her totem has fought off another and has won, but if a woman gets pregnant it means her totem has been overcome. Ayla suspects that this all has something to do with sex, or the "relieving of a man's needs" with a woman. She comes to think of this as a combination of male and female "essence".

Ayla is hated and repeatedly raped by Broud, the son of the leader's mate while she lives with the Clan, he is jealous of the attention she receives. His envy causes him to behave in a disgraceful manner; while Clan women expect to be ordered around, and to obey all requests by all Clan men, Broud also beats and rapes her, impregnating her at the age of eleven. These actions cause his mother's mate, the leader Brun, to question whether Broud is fit to be leader. Upon becoming leader after the former tribal head believes he is ready, Broud places a death curse on Ayla, which forces her to leave the Clan forever, leaving her young toddler mixed-race son Durc behind.

Throughout the series, there are many references to Ayla's having great spiritual and intellectual powers, many of which actually may be simple reasoning and common sense. She does have a knack for inventing things, and is credited with many innovations actually made over thousands of years of human history.

=== The Clan of the Cave Bear ===
Ayla earns her name during her first waking meeting with the Clan members; they cannot pronounce her birth name, and their approximation, "Ayla", becomes her given name. Auel uses the term "polysyllabic" to describe Ayla's birth name, implying it is more than two syllables long. This may be further supported by Creb's first try at pronouncing her name, "Aay-rr", which could be an attempt to say "Aela". However, Auel does not explicitly state the name of Ayla's birth.

As a child among the Clan, she is described as lucky, favored by the spirits. Iza later surmises that Ayla was born to a medicine woman of the Others (Cro-Magnons), though Ayla has very little memory of her birth mother and knows nothing of the tribe of the Others to whom she was born. This passage may be a hint by the author of the reason for Ayla’s mother’s camp to be in such an odd location, with no other mentioned people around. Although Ayla lacks the Clan's ability to access ancestral memories, Iza succeeds in training her as a medicine healer. In her childhood and young adulthood she invents several things previously unknown, as well as innovations to existing tools and their uses (see below.) It is here that we see her winning combination of the Clan's detailed factual knowledge and the Others' innovative and flexible thinking.

When Ayla acts as the medicine woman at the Clan Gathering and prepares the sacred herb for the Mog-urs' ceremony, she ingests some of the juice from the root and is strongly affected by its psychotropic properties. Creb makes telepathic contact with her, and she follows him through his psychic exploration of the Clan "memories". She then follows the path of the Others' divergence from the Clan, and among other things sees a glimpse of the future: "Boxlike structures... long ribbons of stone... strange animals crawling at great speeds... huge birds that flew without flapping their wings." Apparently Auel intended to describe Ayla seeing a glimpse of the modern era, and even beyond to the next stage of human evolution. Creb has seen all these things with her, and telepathically orders her out of the cave when she returns to her own mind, knowing in his heart that only the Others will continue to evolve and that the Clan will die out.

=== The Valley of Horses ===
Alone in a secluded valley where she has fled after being expelled from the Clan, Ayla adopts and raises a cave lion cub she calls Baby and a horse she calls Whinney. She originally stops in the valley to stay for the winter, but stays to take care of the animal friends. She learns that to survive on her own, she must break many Clan traditions she had previously been raised under. She meets Jondalar when he is attacked and mauled by Baby's mate and tends his wounds. He begins teaching her his language. Some weeks or months later she dreams of her own mother speaking to her and of an earthquake (which betoken tragedy and upheaval to Ayla). After this dream, Ayla suddenly speaks Jondalar's language fluently even to the idioms, where before she had spoken only in broken sentences. Auel may have meant this event as a partial recovery of repressed memories, but Ayla still does not remember her own or her mother's name, her language, or anything of her past before her adoption. Jondalar recovers and takes Ayla, Racer (Whinney's offspring), and Whinney with him while he completes the pilgrimage he is on, intending to bring her home to meet his family.

=== The Mammoth Hunters ===
Ayla continues to have psychic and prophetic experiences linked to the rituals used by the Mamutoi people. She dreams that she has two sons, Durc and an unknown son who appears to have no Clan lineage at all; they are on the verge of open conflict, and Ayla struggles to reach them in time to prevent the destruction of one son by the other. It is suggested that the meaning of the dream has less to do with her 'children' than the evolution of the Others and decline of the Clan. Ayla and Jondalar become separated by a misunderstanding, even though they are still living in the same community. She becomes promised to Ranec who comes to believe that she is an incarnation of what he calls the "Spirit Woman", the perfect spirit model of a woman in whose image all are made, and that she may even be the Earth Mother incarnate. Shaman Mamut indicates to Jondalar, Ranec, and Vincavec, another Mamutoi shaman who wants to marry Ayla, that Ayla has some great purpose. Vincavec attempts to hypnotize Ayla, but she is able to resist him, as well as the spiritual influences of others. Though Ayla contends that her ability to tame and win the loyalty of animals is only a matter of time, patience and proper handling, her gift for making friends of numerous animals is considered a sign of her supernatural gifts. Jondalar and Ayla finally reconcile and they begin the journey to Jondalar's home.

=== The Plains of Passage ===
On the journey back to the Zelandonii territory, Jondalar's home, many of the tribes Ayla encounters mistake Ayla's extreme creative intelligence and even her common-sense reasoning for supernatural powers. Jondalar and Ayla both insist that she has no such gifts, but they do not stay in one place long enough to convince anyone otherwise. Ayla continues to have prophetic dreams.

=== The Shelters of Stone ===
Upon arriving at the Ninth Cave, Jondalar's dwelling, Ayla realizes that this cave is identical to one she's been seeing in her dreams. Her dreams and waking psychic visions become more frequent and more powerful, and the female shaman Zelandoni can sense them. However, Ayla rejects Zelandoni's offers to train her as a priestess, saying she merely wishes to live a normal life. Zelandoni finally convinces Ayla to join the spiritual devotees, known as "Those Who Serve the Mother".

=== The Land of Painted Caves ===
Published March 29, 2011. The last book In the Earth's Children's Series, Ayla is now about 25 years old and training to become a spiritual leader of the Zelandonii. Her training includes a series of harrowing journeys and gives her problems when trying to balance her work and her family life.

== Invention and skills ==
- Phenomenal memory: Because she doesn't have inherent Clan memories which allow recall after a few reminders, Ayla is at first seen by the Clan as dimwitted because she must be told or shown repeatedly how to do things. As a defense, she works to develop her memory skills so she needs to be shown or told only once. This knack comes in handy when she encounters new languages.
- Two-stone technique: After almost being harmed by a lynx when she missed with her sling, Ayla develops a technique to reload her sling after a cast during the downfall, for immediate use. In reality, Ayla's method of rapid-slinging two stones is not possible.
- Diagnosis: As reasoned by Iza, although Ayla could not memorize all Clan medicinal lore, she has the ability to reason intuitively, recognize the causes of illnesses and treat them appropriately.
- Fatherhood: On her own, Ayla eventually develops some understanding of the relationship between a male having sex with a female and subsequent pregnancy. Clan belief is that pregnancy is due to spirits and they do not have a biological concept of fatherhood. For that matter, many Cro-Magnon groups which Ayla later encounters have not made this discovery either - though a few other Cro Magnons she encounters have also (independently of each other) come to realize that there is a link between sex and pregnancy. Arguably this has a greater and more widespread impact than any of Ayla's other inventions, because at the end of the series she becomes a shamaness and helps propagate this knowledge - drastically altering the social development of the Cro Magnons, who until then did not live in monogamous couples in the series.
- Brassiere: Ayla is the only Clan woman permitted to hunt (small game only, using a sling). As she matures, she finds that her breasts impede her mobility. "She noticed that men wore a leather loincloth to protect their exposed and delicate organs, and fashioned a band to hold her bosom in place, tied around her back." (The Clan of the Cave Bear, chapter 26.)
- Atlatl: Works with her partner Jondalar to develop a "spear-thrower".
- Taming animals: out of loneliness in her valley, Ayla has raised a horse Whinney, her foal Racer, a Cave Lion cub she calls Baby, later with the mammoth hunters she gets a wolf she simply calls Wolf.
- Horse equipment: Inspired by the idea that she can ride Whinney, Ayla invents drag poles, carrying packs, and notably the travois. Jondalar invents the bridle when he can't master riding without one, as Ayla does.
- Percussion fire starting: After a mistake in making flint weapons, Ayla recognizes that sparks from striking a 'firestone' of iron pyrite with a piece of flint can start a fire.
- Sewing needle: Ayla tried and failed to learn the Mamutoi sewing techniques, and instead came up with a sharp bone with a hole, which she calls a "thread-puller", to draw sinew through leather—instead of just punching holes and pushing the thread in with another tool.
- Surgical stitches: When Ayla first encounters Jondalar his leg has been torn open by a cave lion, to the point where the muscle is hanging off the bone. Ayla determines that in order to heal properly, his leg would have to be physically held closed. She notices how his clothing (in the typical style of his people, but unfamiliar to her) is formed of panels of cloth tied together with thongs, and has the idea to literally tie his leg back together by boring holes in his flesh and muscle, then threading cord through the holes and tying them off. Much later (in The Shelters of Stone) Wolf is mauled almost to death by another wild wolf; Ayla uses her "thread puller" sewing needle to stitch his wounds. Needless to say, both patients made full recoveries.

== Children ==
=== Durc ===
Born to Ayla while she still lived among the Clan, Durc is considered half-caste: part "Other", part Clan. His father is Broud, the brutish son of the Clan leader who repeatedly raped Ayla as a form of punishment. He displays physical characteristics of both Clan (Neanderthal) and the Others (Cro-Magnon); like Ayla, he can vocalize. Durc's fate is bound up in the Clan; when Ayla is cursed with death (outcast) for the second time when she defies Broud who has been named the new leader, she leaves the Clan and her son behind.

Readers around the world express their desire to learn what fate has in store for Durc.

=== Jonayla ===
Jonayla is Ayla's daughter, fathered by Jondalar in the Shelters of Stone. She grows into a beautiful and beloved child, close to both parents, and enjoys time with her own horse, Grey, born to Ayla's horse Whinney.
