= Jondalar =

Fictional character of Earth's Children series

Jondalar of the Zelandonii is the male main character of Jean Auel's Earth's Children speculative historical fiction series set in the Late Stone Age of Europe. He has long pale blond hair which he usually pulls back in a ponytail (called a "club" by his people), vivid blue eyes, is six feet six inches tall, and is described as extremely handsome and skillful in many ways.

Introduced early in the second novel of the series as a "co-star" of the book The Valley of Horses, he and his brother Thonolan are on a long Journey to see the end of the Great Mother River. The Journey had been Thonolan's idea, and Jondalar had come along to keep an eye on his younger brother. Their adventures run parallel to Ayla's years in her Valley. The stories alternate back and forth until the two main characters, Jondalar and Ayla, finally meet, when Jondalar and Thonolan are attacked by a cave lion. Thonolan is killed and Jondalar is seriously hurt. Ayla takes Jondalar to her cave and treats his wounds.

== Ranks and ties ==
Jondalar is the son of Dalanar, leader of the First Cave of the Lanzadonii, and Marthona, former leader of the Ninth Cave of the Zelandonii. He has an older half-brother Joharran, who was born to the hearth of Marthona's first mate Joconan. After Jondalar was born, Marthona and Dalanar "severed the knot;" she then takes another mate by whom Jondalar has two younger half-siblings by Willamar: his brother Thonolan, three years his junior, and his sister Folara, who is nearly ten years younger than Jondalar. He also has a "close cousin," Joplaya, the daughter of Dalanar and his second mate Jerika, whom Dalanar met when her family came into Zelandonii territory. (From the description of her facial features in "Plains of Passage," Jerika appears to be of Mongol or Asian descent; the territory of her people is never pinpointed in the books, making exact racial determinations impossible). The Zelandonii only consider people who share a mother as having a sibling relationship; because men are not fathers, only 'men of the hearth', children born to the same father but different mothers are considered "hearth cousins" rather than siblings. In the first five books, the belief is that the Earth Mother chooses the 'spirit of a man' to make a woman pregnant and it is not known that the act of sex or a man's semen is responsible for impregnating a woman.

Jondalar has one child, Jonayla, his daughter with Ayla born at the end of The Shelters of Stone. Because of the belief that the Great Earth Mother can choose any man's spirit to join with a woman's to make a child, Jondalar at first does not entirely believe that Jonayla is truly as much a daughter of his as she is to Ayla.

There is a possibility that he has fathered two other children. The first is a child with the Hadumai woman Noria, with whom he shared First Rites during the journey with his brother. This is recounted in The Valley of Horses. No details about this child are known, save that Haduma, leader of the Hadumai, believed that the child would have Jondalar's blue eyes. The other child would be that of a Shamudoi woman named Serenio, with whom he lived while he was staying with the Sharamudoi people, also on his journey with Thonolan. Before he left, she told him that she believed she was pregnant. When Jondalar returned with Ayla, he discovered that Serenio had left with a Mamutoi man with whom she fell in love, and though Roshario, another Shamudoi woman and a friend of Serenio, believed Serenio was pregnant, it was unconfirmed.

Jondalar's family is considered to hold high status among the Zelandonii: his mother is the former leader of the Ninth Cave, as well as being the widow of a former leader, Joconan; his elder brother, Joharran, became leader of the Ninth Cave when Marthona stepped down; the man to whose hearth he was born (his father), Dalanar, went on to found the First Cave of the Lanzadonii with Jerika and a group of Zelandonii settlers; the man his mother mated after severing the tie with Dalanar, Willomar, is Trade Master for the Ninth Cave, and as such holds a position similar to an ambassador. Finally, the family (and Jondalar in particular) is friendly with the Zelandoni formerly known as Zolena, who has become First Among Those Who Serve the Mother (roughly a bishop to the other Zelandoni priests) by the time Jondalar returns home with Ayla.

== Personal history ==
Though the child of a high-status Zelandonii family, Jondalar has managed to make quite a name for himself on a personal basis. His first whiff of reputation was his connection with Zolena. Zolena and Jondalar fell in love while Zolena was acting as his donii woman. Though customs dictated that their relationship be solely physical, the two began to discuss the idea of mating; it speaks to Jondalar's inherent charisma and handsomeness that, despite having just entered adulthood, he was able to make a strong emotional connection with a woman who was not only considered the most beautiful of all the Zelandonii, but was some years older than he was. Ladroman, a boy of the Ninth Cave who also wanted Zolena, spied on the lovers and overheard their plans. Thinking to blackmail Zolena into his furs, Ladroman threatened to expose their activities; Jondalar lost his temper and attacked Ladroman, knocking out several of his teeth. The scandal of Jondalar's and Zolena's relationship and plans for the future became public, restitution was made to Ladroman's family, and Jondalar was sent to live with Dalanar, who by that time had established the First Cave of the Lanzadonii.

After several years living with Dalanar and learning to knap flint, as well as honing some of the charm and charisma which his father had passed on to him (the two are physically almost identical), Jondalar returned to the Ninth Cave. Zolena had begun training to become a member of the zelandonia; Ladroman and his family had moved to the Fifth Cave of the Zelandonii; and people had largely forgotten about his previous indiscretions. Jondalar, however, could not forget or forgive himself. Charismatic, extremely handsome, and a sensitive lover, he never lacked for women (Zolena later described him as having an aching hunger that women longed to fill), but neither did he bond with them on an emotional level. Thonolan once described him, accurately, as having never fallen in love with anyone except Zolena. He was frequently asked to participate in the ritual of First Rites. Unfortunately, this only added to his self-loathing, as he was emotionally gratified by the innocence and attachment that the girls felt, but his 'love' for them only lasted for that night. As Jondalar saw it, he had perverted sacred traditions to meet his own emotional needs many times over.

Eventually, Jondalar began a relationship with Marona, a fellow member of the Ninth Cave who was considered the most beautiful woman among the Zelandonii. Though he did not love Marona or the vicious, spiteful spirit beneath her beautiful exterior, Jondalar could not find anyone else appropriate to mate (marry). It is shortly before the Summer Meeting when they had planned to tie the knot that Jondalar unexpectedly decides to accompany Thonolan on his Journey, resulting in Jondalar essentially leaving Marona at the altar. He would not return home for five years.

== Journey ==
Jondalar and Thonolan made their way down the Great Mother, meeting several other peoples along the way. Thonolan, an outgoing, easy-mannered young man, made friends easily, much like the man of his hearth, Willomar. After they had traveled for some time, Thonolan was injured by a rhino and rescued by the Sharamudoi. After being transported back to the camp where they live to heal from his wounds, Thonolan falls in love with a woman named Jetamio, and soon found himself mated and cross-mated with his Shamudoi wife and a Ramudoi couple. Jondalar did not lack for company during his time among the Sharamudoi, and formed a strong attachment to a woman named Serenio; but, as with his other relationships, Jondalar was more physically invested than emotionally. Unfortunately, Jetamio died in childbirth, and Thonolan, stricken, took to his Journey again, hoping to escape grief too heavy to outrun. Jondalar abandoned his relationship with Serenio and continued to accompany him.

Their travels led them all the way to the Beran Sea, the end of the Great Mother River. Lost in his grief over the loss of Jetamio, Thonolan insisted on going on, planning to travel "until the Great Mother took [him].". When a cave lioness stole a deer which Jondalar and Thonolan had just killed during a hunt, Thonolan insisted on tracking her back to her den and retrieving his kill. Inside the box canyon where the lioness and her mate lived, however, the lionesses mate attacked them. Thonolan was killed, and Jondalar almost mauled to death. In the haze of blood loss and pain, he thought a beautiful spirit woman had come for him; when he woke, he found that she was in fact a woman of extraordinary beauty and great skill, living alone in a small cave in a valley.

The woman did not know how to communicate using spoken language when they met, but Jondalar taught her to speak Zelandonii and learned that her name was Ayla. Believing that she was either an acolyte of some tribe's zelandonia or a full-fledged Zelandoni on some kind of sacred retreat, Jondalar was beguiled by her beauty and intrigued by the mystery she presented. Jondalar and Ayla fall in love with one another while Jondalar recovered from his injuries and after awaking from a dream of her own mother speaking to her, Ayla, using the grammar and syntax she has been hearing from Jondalar since she found him, is able to speak Zelandonii almost fluently. As Jondalar learns more about Ayla's background and history, he realizes her only experience with sex is rape and shares First Rites with her, teaching her the Mother's Gift of Pleasure.

Due to Ayla's upbringing among the Clan and the fact that she had given birth to a half-clan son, Jondalar initially believed that she would be vilified and shunned by the Zelandonii. This inner struggle was a great personal crisis for him and Ayla as it affected their relations both in "Valley of Horses" and "The Mammoth Hunters", generally interfering strongly in their relationship as a couple until Jondalar could put his natal prejudices to rest. This "problem attitude" caused serious problems for their relationship in the beginning, as he did not believe himself strong enough to stand beside Ayla in the face of such hatred as he imagined she would incite; this insecurity stemmed from both his attachment to his family and his great self-hatred over the scandals he had already caused.

Through nearly losing Ayla to Ranec of the Mamutoi and then nearly to death, Jondalar has overcome his fears and is willing to stand with Ayla even if it meant being cast out of the Zelandonii; however, in The Shelters of Stone, Zelandonii reaction to Ayla's background is not nearly as vehement as Jondalar imagined and no threats to cast either he or Ayla out were even made. However, it is not common knowledge that Ayla had a son of "mixed spirits" (a Neanderthal-Cro Magnon hybrid), and Zelandoni (Zolena) advised her not to mention him to anyone. If, in the final books, the information becomes public, it may cause changes in the attitudes of the Zelandonii, especially among the zelandonia. However, Ayla has also given birth to a baby girl with no trace of "mixed spirits", which may or may not dispel the idea that she would draw 'flathead' spirits to herself because of her previous child. Even so, Jondalar has sworn not to leave Ayla, and if the Zelandonii turn against her, he is likely to leave his people with her and his daughter, Jonayla.

During the final book, Jondalar, although still secure in his relationship with Ayla, starts seeing ex-girlfriend Marona on the side. This is because Ayla becomes incredibly busy and therefore also tired with her increasing training to join the ranks of the zelandonia. In this society, sex is recreational, and Jondalar's actions are not considered adulterous. However, when Ayla finds out, she is devastated, which leads to a new rift between the two. This is only overcome when Ayla nearly dies during a spiritual coma and Jondalar brings her back. Ayla's Gift of Knowledge from her spiritual Calling is that men are necessary in the conception of babies, and this leads to Ayla and Jondalar's relationship being the first monogamous pairing resembling current-day marriage.

== Traits, skills and powers ==
Jondalar is an accomplished flint knapper, occasionally identified as an equal to other known master knappers such as Wymez of the Mamutoi and his father, Dalanar. He once thought to become a carver, and has some skill at that trade as well. He is an able hunter and tracker. He has participated in many of Ayla's 'miracles', such as the conscious training of the world's second domesticated horse, and was almost single-handedly responsible for the invention of the spearthrower and two-piece spear that breaks on impact leaving the shaft undamaged and reusable compared to a single piece spear that frequently breaks.

Jondalar is known to be decent, stubborn, and extremely emotional; the major indiscretions in his life (the affair with Zolena, the assault on Ladroman, the emotional vampirism of First Rites) have all been precipitated by the intensity of his emotion and his lack of self-control. He supposedly gained some control during his years living with the Lanzadonii, but Ayla's brief relationship with Ranec caused an explosion of jealousy which belies this idea. He has also been endowed with a "prodigious manhood," and, as no woman has had the ability to accept his full measure save Ayla, he has been unable to find total abandon and sexual fulfillment, despite some gratification. In a bit of heavy-handed symbolism on Auel's part, his emotional intensity parallels his physical prowess; on every level he is forced to hold back, for fear that he will overwhelm and hurt his partner, and the only woman with the emotional and physical depths to fully accommodate him is the heroine, Ayla. Finally, he is a very physical creature, and has exhibited the practice of measuring distances quite accurately by judging them against his own height (6'6"), the length of his stride, and so on.

While Jondalar does not have the psychic abilities Ayla seems to, he has a few prescient moments. In Ayla's valley cave, Jondalar has a strange dream about the Earth Mother giving birth, as the legends of the Zelandonii describe; he sees that Doni not only gives birth to the land and water and animals and Zelandonii, but to the Clan as well. When he wakes, he feels a strangeness in the air, and sees Ayla crying; he has an impression of the Mother crying superimposed over Ayla. It is said of Jondalar that Doni is unable to refuse him anything he asks for. During a ceremony of the Mamutoi, when Ayla and Mamut use the root which triggered her psychic visions with Creb during the Clan Gathering, she and Mamut become trapped in the void and cannot find their way out; Creb had pulled Ayla out during her visions, and neither she nor Mamut knew how he had done it. Jondalar, fearing that Ayla had died, fell to his knees beside her unconscious body and begged the Mother to bring her back. Ayla and Mamut felt themselves pulled back, and Mamut later tells Ayla that they were returned only by great strength of will but it could also be due to Jondalar's plea. He also tells Ayla that she will need the protection of such a powerful will if she ever decides to use the herbs again. When Mamut tells Jondalar that Ayla's life belongs to the Earth Mother and that whomever she mates will be tied to her purpose, it seems as though he is trying to warn Jondalar not to leave her. When Mamut tells Ranec and Vincavec the same thing, it seems that he is attempting to warn them away from Ayla, obliquely informing them that they are not suited to help Ayla in the purpose Mut has for her.

=== Physical traits ===
Jondalar is portrayed as masculine and virile by Auel.

== Relationships ==
=== Dalanar ===
Dalanar is leader of the First Cave of the Lanzadonii, a splinter colony located in western Switzerland and former spouse of Marthona, now the former leader of the Ninth Cave of the Zelandonii. Dalanar and Marthona had a complicated and deep love affair about which the singers and story tellers still speak of with reverence and perhaps a touch of envy. As revealed in The Shelters of Stone, Dalanar is so close in physical resemblance to Jondalar that Ayla found herself momentarily confused by and responding physically (sexually) to his nearness. He is still good friends with Marthona, and leads his people to camp near the Ninth Cave encampment at the Zelandonii summer meeting central to the fifth book.

Like Jondalar, Dalanar is a master flint knapper, but like his ex-mate Marthona, has a strong leadership drive, and need to assert himself in such a capacity. That need to express his opinion and corollary differences of opinion with Marthona is the best and only description in his back story as to why he and Marthona split apart and he came to lead a colony group from the Ninth Cave off to the east while Jondalar was just a toddler. Why the splinter colony (from the ninth cave) he founded is named the Lanzadonii vs. Zelandonii is never adequately explained, though it is clear in several scenes of The Shelters of Stone that the Lanzadonii are still considered to belong—part of the greater people—at least in the minds of several groups of leaders and Zeladonii shamans.

=== Thonolan ===
Thonolan, the younger brother of Jondalar, is handsome, dark haired and significantly shorter than his very tall brother, but ready with a laugh, frequent smiles and constantly joking. He is fifteen to Jondalar's eighteen when he decides to undertake "his journey" to the mouth of the Great Mother River, and Jondalar decides to tag along to protect his younger sibling, whom he loves dearly. The second book, The Valley of Horses — introduces Jondalar and Thonolan traveling from the lands of the Lanzadonii, in today's western Switzerland, across the great glaciers capping the Alps into the upper Danube valley (Germany or Austria, given fictional license and Ice Age glacier sizes) accompanying his younger impetuous and head-strong brother Thonolan on his journey, putatively to reach the mouth of the Great Mother River (Danube).

Thonolan is charismatic, good looking, engaging, likable, irreverent and hardly ever serious while being skilled at wood bending and spear straightening, his craft in the master-of-all-trades world imagined by Auel. He has a tendency to devil may care heroics: a moment of carelessness gets him mauled by a woolly rhinoceros, and another episode gets him killed by a Cave Lion. Jondalar's life is impacted as well by both episodes of his brother's behavioral carelessness. In the first case, Thonolan's mauling allows the brothers to meet with another Stone Age society, winter with them, and Thonolan marries into the group. The two renew their journey to the end of the Great Mother River when his bride dies in childbirth. Thonolan's personality changes, becoming dark and fatalistic—and even more prone to taking risks. In the second case, Thonolan's death brings him together with Ayla.

=== Zolena ===
Zolena, now First Among Those Who Serve the Great Earth Mother (Zelandoni), was the first love of Jondalar's life. Originally his tutor in the art of sex, Zolena and Jondalar developed a strong emotional, but socially unacceptable, attachment as well as physical compatibility. Before the incident with Ladroman which resulted in Jondalar's temporary exile, Jondalar and Zolena were planning to tie the knot. After Jondalar left in exile, Zolena became an acolyte of the zelandonia, and joined the ranks of doniers during the Summer Meeting when Jondalar left on his Journey with Thonolan. Upon Jondalar's return, Zolena displays great affection for Jondalar, and, according to Ayla, still loves him. She has become 'a fat old woman'; Zolena has guessed that she was able to become First because the Great Mother knew she would grow to resemble Her. She has no children and is fiercely protective of those in her charge, especially the man she once considered breaking traditions for and mating.

=== Joplaya ===
During the time he lived with Dalanar and the Lanzadonii, Jondalar came to know his 'hearth cousin' Joplaya quite well. (As conjected by Ayla, Joplaya is most likely Jondalar's half-sister via Dalanar, but since it is understood that only women can make children there is no such connection aside from a cultural relationship of 'hearth' or 'close' cousins.) Joplaya fell madly in love with Jondalar, and hoped that he would come to feel the same way about her. It was obvious by the way he treated her that he only felt a kinship with her, as well as a friendly rivalry due to her own skills as a flint knapper. Even after Jondalar returned to the Zelandonii, Joplaya still held out hope that he would realize her feelings and return them. Only after Jondalar returned from his Journey with Ayla, madly in love, did Joplaya give up hope of a deeper relationship between them; she accepted the suit of Echozar, a half-Clan man who had been taken in first by Andovan of the S'Armunai and then by the Lanzadonii after Andovan's death. The two mated at the same Matrimonial as Ayla and Jondalar.

=== Marona ===
Considered the most beautiful woman at recent Zelandonii Summer Meetings, Jondalar began a relationship with Marona at some point between his return from the Lanzadonii cave and leaving with Thonolan on their Journey. Marona was a fellow member of the Ninth Cave and a cousin of Jondalar's, though distantly related. Known for her spiteful behavior and her skill with the Mother's Gift of Pleasure, Marona was planning to tie the knot with Jondalar at the Summer Meeting before he left unexpectedly. She was understandably vexed, but when Jondalar returned five years later he discovered that she still begrudged him their sundered engagement; she has also, by extension, shown vicious hostility towards Ayla. Though she found an acceptable substitute to mate, she and her unnamed spouse severed the knot several years later; she has no children, and characters have speculated that she is barren. During the final book, she re-kindled what she believed to be a relationship with Jondalar, but which was revealed as purely physical gratification on his part as Ayla was so often away, distracted or tired due to her spiritual training and duties. When Jondalar asserts his great love for Ayla, she leaves, dejected and embarrassed.

=== Noria ===
A young Hadumai woman whom Jondalar met on his Journey. When he and Thonolan were taken in by the Hadumai for a time, Haduma, the matriarch and founder of the tribe, requested that Jondalar be the man at Noria's First Rites. (The visitors had barely established a common language when this happened, a testament to Jondalar's obvious charisma.) Haduma indicated that Jondalar would impregnate Noria during First Rites, and that the child would have Jondalar's blue eyes. The truth of this claim was never proven, as Jondalar and Ayla were unable to visit Noria and/or her purported child on their return Journey.

=== Serenio ===
Jondalar's lover among the Sharamudoi, Serenio was an unmated woman with a young son, Darvo; Jondalar found her pleasant and companionable, but could not bring himself to love her. The brief description of their liaison seems to be highly symbolic, used by Auel as a device to illustrate Jondalar's emotional state of mind before meeting Ayla. When Jondalar and Ayla return from the valley and stop at the Sharamudoi camp where he and Thonolan had stayed previously, Serenio had left the camp to mate with a cousin of Thonolan's female cross-mate; Darvo stayed with the Shamudoi.

=== Ayla ===
As described above, Ayla is the second and true love of Jondalar's life. Having saved his life and healed him so well that no one would expect that he had been mauled by a cave lion, Ayla won Jondalar's heart with a potent mix of experience and innocence, strength and vulnerability. She is a mature woman who had lived a lifetime before they met, yet approached life with the innocent qualities of a young woman at First Rites. Mamut, Ayla's adoptive father and the most powerful holy man among the Mamutoi, hinted more than once that Jondalar is a necessary part of whatever fate the Great Mother has in store for Ayla. Jondalar has fathered a daughter with Ayla named Jonayla. They become the first true happily monogamous couple. Ayla loves Jondalar. In the third book of Earths Children, they have some conflict. Jondalar thinks Ayla doesn't love him because she is talking with Ranec. And Ayla thinks that Jondalar doesn't love her because he is acting jealous and mad.

== Notes and references ==
- "The Valley of Horses" — Second book of the series
- "The Mammoth Hunters" — Third book tying into archeological digs in Ukraine and Poland along the margins of the ice sheet.
- "The Plains of Passage" — A travel book detailing Ayla and Jondalar's adventures traveling up the Danube basin and recrossing the Alps.
- "The Shelters of Stone" — Similar to "The Mammoth Hunters", the focus of this cultural exploration is the interactions of the Paleolithic society of Jondalar's Zelan
