= Israel's Secret Wars =

1991 book written by Ian Black and Benny Morris

Israel's Secret Wars: A History of Israel's Intelligence Services
- Cover of book updated in 1994.
- Author: Ian Black & Benny Morris
- Language: English
- Genre: Non-fiction
- Publisher: Grove Press
- Publication date: 1991
- Publication place: United States
- Media type: Print
- Pages: 634 pp
- ISBN: 978-0-8021-3286-4
- OCLC: 249707944
- Text: Israel's Secret Wars: A History of Israel's Intelligence Services at Internet Archive

Israel's Secret Wars: A History of Israel's Intelligence Services (also known as Israel's Secret Wars: The Untold History of Israeli Intelligence) is a 1991 book written by Ian Black and Benny Morris about the history of the Israeli intelligence services from the period of the Yishuv to the end of the 1980s. It was updated in 1994 to include the Gulf War period.

It explores the role of secret intelligence and covert activities in the Zionist movement before independence and explore the operational and political histories all three major Israeli intelligence agencies Aman (military intelligence), Mossad (foreign intelligence and covert operations) and Shin Bet (internal security).

John C. Campbell, writing in Foreign Affairs, the journal of the Council on Foreign Relations, said that the book "cannot be the definitive history, but it comes as close as we are likely to get and is especially good in showing how critical to, and closely interwoven with, the fate of the nation these agencies have been."

== See also ==
- New Historians
- By Way of Deception: The Making and Unmaking of a Mossad Officer
- Every Spy a Prince: The Complete History of Israel's Intelligence Community
