= Every Spy a Prince =

Every Spy a Prince: The Complete History of Israel's Intelligence Community
- Author: Dan Raviv and Yossi Melman
- Language: English
- Genre: Non-fiction
- Publisher: Houghton Mifflin
- Publication date: 1990
- Publication place: United States
- Media type: Print
- Pages: 473 pp
- ISBN: 978-0-395-58120-9
- OCLC: 23685601

Every Spy a Prince: The Complete History of Israel's Intelligence Community is a 1990 book by Dan Raviv and Yossi Melman on the history of the Israeli intelligence community.

== History ==
In 1989, it was published in the United Kingdom as The Imperfect Spies: The History of Israeli Intelligence. The book was on the New York Times Best Seller list for 12 weeks (August 12, 1990 - October 28). The title of the book comes from the Book of Numbers:"The Lord spoke to Moses, saying, "Send men that they may spy out the land of Canaan, which I give to the children of Israel; of every tribe of their fathers shall you send a man, everyone one a prince among them."(Numbers 13:1-2)

== Critical acclaim ==
A New York Times book review called it an "utterly fascinating account of Israeli intelligence." The critic said that the book suffered from the "kitchen-sink syndrome." Despite the fact that "many of the adventures recounted here have been told before," he concluded that the book broke "substantial new ground." In a later review, Herbert Mitgang found it "a detailed though rambling look at Israel's intelligence community as it has developed since the founding of the Jewish state." In Foreign Affairs, John C. Campbell described it as "investigative journalism of the first rank. It gives the most expansive account yet of the Mossad..." Writer Daniel Pipes praised the book for sticking to sober prose, providing appropriate context for the activities described, and most importantly, for making "serious efforts to reach a balanced assessment of Israel's spies."

== See also ==
- Israel's Secret Wars: A History of Israel's Intelligence Services
- By Way of Deception: The Making and Unmaking of a Mossad Officer
