= The Clan of the Cave Bear (film) =

1986 film by Michael Chapman

- Theatrical release poster
- Directed by: Michael Chapman
- Written by: John Sayles
- Based on: The Clan of the Cave Bear by Jean M. Auel
- Produced by: Gerald Isenberg
- Starring: Daryl Hannah; Pamela Reed; James Remar; Thomas G. Waites; John Doolittle
- Narrated by: Salome Jens
- Cinematography: Jan de Bont
- Edited by: Wendy Greene Bricmont
- Music by: Alan Silvestri
- Production companies: Producers Sales Organization; The Guber-Peters Company
- Distributed by: Warner Bros.
- Release date: January 17, 1986 (New York City)
- Running time: 98 minutes
- Country: United States
- Language: English
- Budget: $18 million
- Box office: $2 million (United States)

The Clan of the Cave Bear is a 1986 American adventure film directed by Michael Chapman and based on the book of the same name by Jean M. Auel. The film stars Daryl Hannah, Pamela Reed, James Remar, and Thomas G. Waites.

The film depicts a young Cro-Magnon woman (Hannah) who is separated from her family and orphaned during an earthquake. She is found and adopted by a group of Neanderthals. As the years go by, her intelligence causes disaster for the entire tribe, especially its future chief, Broud (Waites). Dialogue is conducted mostly through a form of sign language which is translated for the audience with subtitles.

== Plot ==
After losing her mother in an earthquake in Paleolithic Europe, five-year-old Cro-Magnon Ayla is left alone in the woods. She then suffers a severe injury to her legs from a nearby cave lion. After suffering from starvation, exhaustion, and infection of her wounds, she collapses, on the verge of death. She is rescued by Iza, the healer of a group of Neanderthals who call themselves "The Clan," against the orders for her to be left to die by the clan's chief, Brun, because she is clearly a member of "the Others", the distrusted antagonists of the Clan. Brun refuses to accept Ayla when Iza adopts her, only allowing her to stay with the Clan because Iza refuses to abandon her.

Through meditation, Iza's brother, Creb (the group's shaman), comes to believe that the child may be protected by the spirit of the cave lion, a powerful "totem that is never given to a woman and very few men. He cites the cave lion attack the girl experienced shortly before being discovered as proof that its spirit marked her so that she could be adopted into the Clan. After traveling with them for a while and starting to heal, Ayla wanders away from the group when they stop to discuss what they should do and she discovers a huge, beautiful cave, perfect for their needs; many of the people begin to regard Ayla as lucky, especially since good fortune continues to come their way as they begin to accept her in the fold.

Ayla's different thought processes lead her to break important Clan customs, particularly the taboo against females handling weapons. She is self-willed and spirited, but tries hard to fit in with the Neanderthals, although she has to learn everything first-hand; she does not possess the ancestral memories of the Clan which enable them to do certain tasks after being shown only once.

Iza reflects how ugly Ayla is (her unusual appearance compared to the rest of the Clan and Neanderthal standards). Iza is concerned that when Ayla grows up nobody will want her as their mate, making her a burden to the Clan. Seeking to increase Ayla's value and status, Iza trains her to be a medicine woman which will garner respect. Even without a mate, Ayla will have status.

Broud, the son of the tribe's leader Brun, has disdain for Ayla, and when they both reach adulthood, Broud brutally rapes Ayla in an impulsive bid to demonstrate his control over her. Broud continues to assault Ayla constantly, leaving her despondent, and she becomes pregnant. Ayla witnesses Broud trying to master a sling with no success, she then takes it and secretly practices, soon becoming skilled with it. When a wolf attacks and is carrying off a small boy, Ayla is desperate to save the child and successfully kills the wolf with the sling. Grateful for her action, the clan reduces her punishment for using a weapon. Instead of killing her, they banish her from their settlement for a month, effectively a death sentence anyway. However, she finds shelter in another cave. Following a difficult childbirth, Ayla rejoices in the birth of a son. Struggling but able to survive harsh winter conditions, she returns to the tribe after her banishment period ends. She learns that her infant son Durc will be killed, as his appearance (being an amalgamation of Clan and Other features) is considered deformed and a precipitant of bad luck. However, Creb intervenes, appealing to Brun that Creb's deformities also qualified him as a burden but he was spared and grew to become a well-regarded tribe member and shaman. Ayla, having proven her survival and hunting skills, is allowed to keep her son.

After Iza's death, Broud is named chief by Brun. Broud's first order is to take Ayla for himself and separate her from her son, giving him to another couple. Broud also exiles the elderly Creb as another shaman has been designated. Ayla opposes and fights Broud, defeating him. Brun confronts Broud, shaming Broud. Thus a humiliated Broud agrees to keep Creb with the clan. Ayla still chooses to leave, saying goodbye to her son and Creb, in search of her own people, the Others, in the lands far to the west.

== Cast ==
- Daryl Hannah as Ayla
- Pamela Reed as Iza
- James Remar as Creb
- Thomas G. Waites as Broud
- John Doolittle as Brun
- Curtis Armstrong as Goov
- Martin Doyle as Grod
- Tony Montanaro as Zoug
- Mike Muscat as Dorv
- Karen Elizabeth Austin as Aba
- Janne Mortil as Ovra
- Lycia Naff as Uba
- Penny Smith as Ika
- Rory Crowley as Durc
- Joey Cramer as young Broud
- Nicole Eggert as Teen Ayla
- Paul Carafotes as Brug
- Bart the Bear as the cave bear
- Emma Floria as Young Ayla
- Mary Reid as Ayla's Mother

== Production ==
=== Development ===
Stan Rogow obtained the rights to the book saying "I was able to convince Jean that I understood the material." Co-producer Gerald Isenberg originally conceived the film as a television film but was rejected by NBC.

He eventually obtained finance from the Producers Sales Organisation, which wanted to make two films simultaneously, based on Clan of the Cave Bear and The Valley of Horses. John Sayles was hired to write the scripts and the job of directing was offered to Lewis Teague, who had worked twice before with Sayles. Teague said he turned down the project as "I didn't think it was possible to make a good film out of Valley and I thought the production problems in trying to make two films would have been impossible." Eventually Michael Chapman was hired to direct, after which the producers decided just to make the one movie.

Universal Pictures then dropped the project; however, it was quickly picked up by Warner Bros. Pictures.

=== Shooting ===
The film was shot in western Canada, primarily in British Columbia, between June and October 1984 with a budget of $16 million. It was filmed in the Regional District of Okanagan-Similkameen, a precursor to the many Hollywood productions that would film in Canada soon after (see Hollywood North and Cinema of Canada). It was also filmed at Cathedral and MacMillan Provincial Parks, at the Nahanni National Park Reserve in the Northwest Territories, and in the Yukon Territory. The score was composed by Alan Silvestri.

The actors endured scenes located in mountains but wearing minimal clothing of animal pelts in temperatures as low as 5 °F (−15 °C). The makeup for actors portraying Neanderthals took 3.5 hours to apply. Make-up was by Michael Westmore and Michèle Burke, who had won Best Makeup Oscars for Mask and Quest for Fire respectively — the latter another, more fantastical, Stone Age drama.

The animals were trained by professional employees from Heber City, Utah's Wasatch Rocky Mountain Wildlife, Thousand Oaks, California's Animal Actors of Hollywood and Frazier Park, California's Working Wildlife. This film is one of Bart the Bear's earliest roles. He was partly replaced by an animatronic bear designed by Sonny Burman and Steve Johnson. The muskox hunt was filmed just outside Hughenden, Alberta.

== Box office and reception ==
The film opened on one screen in New York City (Loews N.Y. Twin 2) and grossed $25,428 in its opening weekend. Due to the production budget of US$15 million earning back only US$1.9 million in the United States and Canada, the film was unanimously considered a financial failure.

The film holds a 10% rating on Rotten Tomatoes, based on ten reviews. However, The Encyclopedia of Fantasy states "It is hard to see why TCOTCB has drawn such critical contempt, unless for its tacit feminism: although the narration is overexpository and the equation of mental versatility with leggy blonde Cro-Magnons, as opposed to shabby Neanderthals, is a cliché, the movie is beautifully shot, well scripted and finely acted." Audiences polled by CinemaScore gave the film an average grade of "B−" on an A+ to F scale.

Colin Greenland reviewed The Clan of the Cave Bear for White Dwarf magazine and stated that "there's a movie starring Daryl Hannah, whom I still like a lot, though she doesn't stand a chance amid all the picture-postcard photography, tacky mysticism and shaggy-browed sentimentality. But Ayla is unafraid, for she knows there are five more books to go yet."

The film was nominated for the Best Makeup Oscar, losing to The Fly.
