= Dan Raviv =

American journalist (born 1954)

- Born: 1954 (age 71–72); New York City, U.S.
- Education: Harvard University
- Occupation: Journalist
- Children: 2

Dan Raviv (born 1954) is an American journalist.

== Career ==
Raviv was the senior Washington correspondent for Israel-based i24 News, 2017 to 2020. Previously he was with CBS News for over 40 years as their national correspondent and was heard regularly on the CBS Radio Network. He had also done TV reports from Washington, D.C., on the CBS Evening News, and he narrated the 1997–98 revival of the CBS TV shorts series for children In the News.

Up until January 21, 2017, Raviv was host of a weekly radio magazine show, the CBS News Weekend Roundup.

A New York City native and graduate of Harvard, Raviv joined CBS at its all-news radio station in Boston (WEEI) in 1974, moving to WCBS Newsradio in New York in 1976, then to the network radio newsdesk in New York. The start of his on-air career was his assignment in the Tel Aviv bureau, from 1978 to 1980, followed by twelve years as radio correspondent in the London bureau. There, he began making occasional appearances on CBS TV. He worked in the Miami bureau from 1993 to 1997, and then was named National Correspondent in the radio unit at CBS News in Washington. In 2017 he joined i24 News upon the network's launching of a channel in the United States. He is also the author of several books, including the 1990 best seller Every Spy a Prince: The Complete History of Israel's Intelligence Community, and a 2012 sequel Spies Against Armageddon: Inside Israel's Secret Wars, co-authored with journalist Yossi Melman, and a solo book about Marvel Entertainment's rise from bankruptcy, Comic Wars.

In 2025 he launched a weekly audio podcast, The Mossad Files.

== Personal life ==
Raviv is married, with two adult children.
