= Enemies and Neighbours =

Book by Ian Black

- Author: Ian Black
- Language: English
- Subject: Israeli–Palestinian conflict
- Genre: History
- Publisher: Allen Lane
- Publication date: 2017
- Publication place: United Kingdom
- Media type: Print (hardcover and paperback)
- Pages: 606
- ISBN: 978-0241004425

Enemies and Neighbours: Arabs and Jews in Palestine and Israel, 1917–2017 is a 2017 book by British journalist Ian Black.

== Reception ==
The Financial Times listed the book on their 2023 list of the best books for understanding the Israeli–Palestinian conflict, saying it had "achieved the rare distinction of being acclaimed by both Israeli and Palestinian historians for its rigour and impartiality." The New York Times named it one of three books to read to understand why the United States' decision to move its embassy to Jerusalem prompted protests, noting Black's "balanced account". JP O'Malley wrote in The Times of Israel that in the book Black approached accusations of ethnic cleansing of Arabs from Israel in 1948 with "a little more caution and nuance" than the subject was treated by Ilan Pappé. Michael Daventry, writing in The Jewish Chronicle, called it "an ambitious attempt at even-handedness", noting that Black's balanced approach had "attracted praise from critics", including Israeli political scientist Meron Benvenisti and Palestinian academic Sari Nusseibeh. The Sunday Times called it "an even-handed study of the intractable Arab/Israeli problem".
