= The Other Side of Deception =

1994 book by Victor Ostrovsky

- Author: Victor Ostrovsky
- Language: English
- Subject: Mossad
- Publisher: HarperCollins
- Publication date: 1994
- Publication place: United States
- Pages: 315
- ISBN: 978-0060176358
- Preceded by: By Way of Deception

The Other Side of Deception is a follow-up to the best-selling nonfiction book By Way of Deception by Victor Ostrovsky, a former Mossad agent with operational knowledge. It contains a bibliography of newspaper articles in support of the original book.

== Summary ==
The book concerns the concept of a Mossad divide and conquer strategy, pitting secular Arabs against Islamist Arabs and between Arab Muslims and Non-Arab Muslims such as between Iran and Iraq. The Mossad assists Hamas in destroying the PLO and creates a civil war between the secular and Islamist factions of the Palestinians. The book was written in 1994, but his predictions came true with the election of Hamas in the Gaza Strip and the civil war that broke through between Hamas and the PLO. The relations between Hamas and the Mossad soured after the Second Intifada, which occurred after the writing of this book.

In the Iran–Contra affair, Israel helps arm the Iranians during the Iran-Iraq war with the ultimate goal of using Iran to create major damage to Iraq, which would be too busy to retaliate.

According to Ostrovsky, Mossad poisoned German politician Uwe Barschel, who had helped Mossad in their dealings with the Iranians but was going to reveal the secrets of his dealings. The murder was very unusual because his corpse was found fully clothed in a bathtub full of water, in an attempt to make it look like a suicide. In July 2011, German authorities in Lübeck announced that they would reopen the murder investigation of his death.

Ostrovsky also alleges Mossad co-ordinated the assassination of Israeli general Yekutiel Adam. General Adam was chosen as the head of Mossad but was hated by a right-wing clique of extremists within it, who co-ordinated his assassination when he went to Lebanon. The death of the general was reported to be a combat casualty, but Ostrovsky states that friends who were active in the Mossad told him that the clique in the Mossad had paid a Palestinian to assassinate Adam and that a picture of the General was found in the pocket of the Palestinian assassin working for Mossad.

In mid-February 1986, the Mossad allegedly planted a radio relay device, the "Trojan", in a rented apartment in Tripoli, the capital of Libya.
