= Ian Black (journalist) =

British journalist and author (1953–2023)

- Born: 15 July 1953
- Died: 22 January 2023 (aged 69)
- Occupations: Journalist, author
- Spouse: Helen Harris
- Children: 3

Ian Black (15 July 1953 – 22 January 2023) was a British journalist and author whose work focussed on international political issues. He was widely regarded as being skilled at approaching the Arab-Israeli conflict in a non-partisan way. His 2017 book Enemies and Neighbours: Arabs and Jews in Palestine and Israel, 1917–2017 in particular was noted for its even-handed treatment of the subject.

== Early life and education ==
Ian Myles Black was born 15 July 1953 in Sheffield (England) and was the middle of three children of Rita and Wilfrid Black who, like many Jews of that period, had made his way in the garment business.

Black attended Clifton College and Leeds Grammar School. He received an MA in history and social and political science from Emmanuel College, Cambridge and a PhD in government from the London School of Economics and Political Science.

== Career ==
Black spent most of his career at The Guardian newspaper, starting in 1980 as a reporter and variously serving as Middle East correspondent, diplomatic editor, European editor and lead writer, and Middle East editor. In 1983 he received a Stern fellowship to work for several months at the Washington Post. Back at the Guardian, he covered the first Palestinian intifada and the Oslo Accords.

Black was regarded as approaching the Arab-Israeli conflict in a non-partisan manner. According to The Guardian, his writing on the conflict "somehow managed to retain the respect of both sides". According to Madawi al-Rasheed, Black was "both a journalist and an academic, approaching the complex crises that plagued the region with objectivity and integrity.”

Black also worked briefly for The Jerusalem Post and wrote for The Economist.

Black retired in 2017 and became a visiting senior fellow at the Middle East Centre at the London School of Economics.

== Reception ==
Financial Times named Black's 2017 Enemies and Neighbours to their 2023 list of the best books for understanding the Israeli-Palestinian conflict, saying it had "achieved the rare distinction of being acclaimed by both Israeli and Palestinian historians for its rigour and impartiality." The New York Times named it one of 3 books to read to understand why moving the US embassy to Jerusalem prompted protests, noting Black's "balanced account". JP O'Malley wrote in The Times of Israel that Black approached accusations of ethnic cleansing of Arabs from Israel in 1948 with "a little more caution and nuance" than the subject was treated by Ilan Pappe. The New Arab called him "hugely respected in the world of media, for his coverage of Palestine and Israel. Michael Daventry, writing in The Jewish Chronicle, called Enemies and Neighbours "an ambitious attempt at even-handedness" and that his balanced approach had "attracted praise from critics", including Israeli political scientist Meron Benvenisti and Palestinian academic Sari Nusseibeh. The Sunday Times called Enemies and Neighbours "an even-handed study of the intractable Arab/Israeli problem".

== Awards ==
In 2010, Black was awarded a Peace through Media Award by the International Council for Press and Broadcasting at the sixth annual International Media Awards in London.

== Personal life and death ==
Black and his wife, Helen Harris, whom he married in 1990, lived in the Golders Green neighborhood of London and had two daughters. He also had a son from a previous marriage to Maya Barr, which ended in 1987.

In 2021 Black was diagnosed with frontotemporal lobar degeneration and later corticobasal syndrome, both disorders of the neurological system. He died 22 January 2023, at the age of 69.

== Works ==
- Israel's Secret Wars: A History of Israel's Intelligence Services. With Benny Morris. (Grove Press, 1991) ISBN 0-8021-1159-9
- Zionism and the Arabs 1936-1939. (Routledge, 2016) ISBN 978-1138907348
- Enemies and Neighbours: Arabs and Jews in Palestine and Israel, 1917–2017. (Atlantic Monthly Press, 2017) ISBN 978-0802127037
