= Yossi Melman =

Israeli writer and journalist (born 1950)

- יוסי מלמן
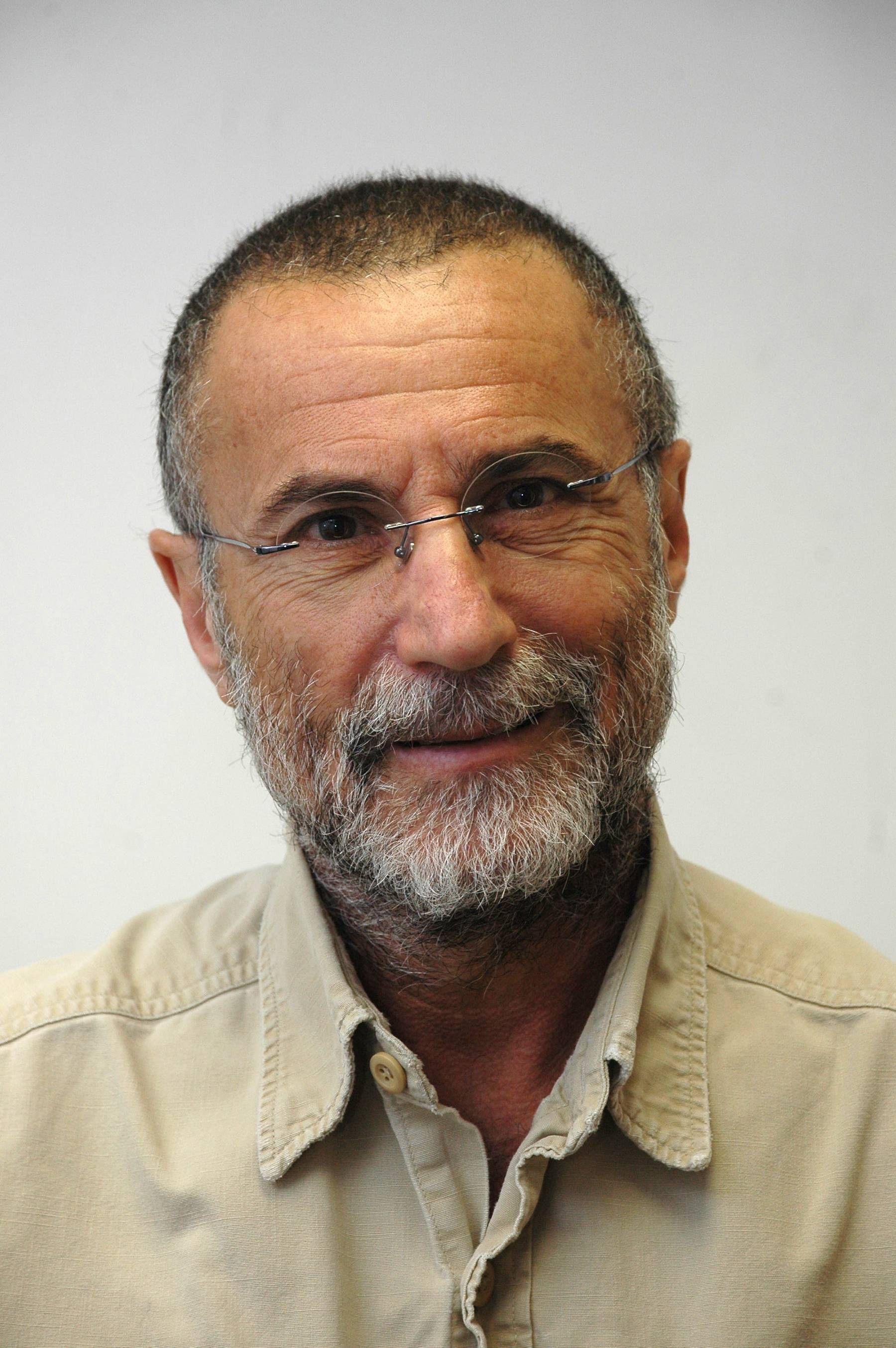
- Born: Yosef Melman; December 27, 1950 (age 75); Poland
- Citizenship: Israel
- Occupations: Writer, journalist
- Employer(s): Haaretz, The Jerusalem Post, Maariv

Yossi Melman (Hebrew: יוסי מלמן; born December 27, 1950) is an Israeli writer and journalist. He was an intelligence and strategic affairs correspondent for the Haaretz newspaper, and in 2013 he joined The Jerusalem Post and its Hebrew sister paper Maariv in a similar, more analytical role covering also military issues. In 2019 he returned to Haaretz.

== Biography ==
Yosef "Yossi" Melman was born in Poland. The family immigrated to Israel in 1957, when he was six years old. In his youth, he belonged to the HaShomer HaTzair movement. From 1969 Melman served for three years with "Shaked", a reconnaissance and Special Forces unit in the Israel Defense Forces. He graduated from Hebrew University of Jerusalem and was a Nieman Fellow at Harvard University.

Since 1974, Melman has worked in various capacities in the Israeli media. He has worked for 27 years in the Israeli Haaretz daily as a senior correspondent on national security, intelligence and strategic issues. Melman was involved in several legal and public battles to lift gag orders issued by Israeli courts and censors.

He wrote 10 non-fiction books on the Israeli Intelligence Community, security, terrorism and nuclear issues which were published in more than 40 countries in 15 languages. One of his books, Every Spy a Prince, co-authored with former CBS News reporter Dan Raviv, was a New York Times best-seller for 12 weeks. Melman also wrote a play in Hebrew, The Good Son, staged by the Tel Aviv Cameri Theater in 2006.

In 2016 he was a consultant and protagonist in Alex Gibney's documentary Zero Days, which won the Peabody Award.

In 2017 he created with director Duki Dror a four-part TV documentary called The Mossad Cover Story. The series received good reviews in the Israeli media. In 2019, it was aired by Netflix under the title Inside The Mossad.

Melman is an avid runner and triathlete who ran 35 marathons in Europe and the US, six ultramarathons of 50 to 75 km and four Ironman Triathlons. He is the initiator and founder of "Israman" (Israel's Ironman). In 2009, eighty days after suffering a heart attack, he returned to run a full marathon. One of his books in Hebrew is called "Autobiography of Running". In December 2016 he ran 66 km to mark his 66th birthday.

In 2020, US President Donald Trump retweeted Melman's account of the killing of Mohsen Fakhrizadeh, head of the nuclear program of Iran.

In 2022 he wrote (together with Marc Dugain) the script for the French-Hebrew-English film and series Munich: Of Games And Blood (Des Jeux Et Du Sang Munich 1972) directed by Philippe Saada.

In 2025, marking the 30th anniversary of the assassination of Yitzhak Rabin, he created and wrote the screenplay for a Hebrew-language documentary examining the incitement by the extreme right and by Benjamin Netanyahu that led to the murder, as well as the Shin Bet's failure to prevent it. According to Melman, the film's themes resonate deeply with October 7 attacks.

In 2026, he was a partner in creating his fifth film, "The Sunrise File". This is an animated film that tells about the secret connections between the Nazi hunter couple Serge and Beate Klarsfeld and the Mossad, and their attempts to persuade the Israeli intelligence agency to act to assassinate Klaus Barbie ("The Butcher of Lyon"), and other Nazi war criminals. Melman is one of the film's producers, and the film is based on his writing and a story he wrote about Mossad documents he obtained.

Melman is married to Billie Rozensweig, a Tel Aviv-born Israeli historian. They have two children: Yotam and Daria.

== Views and opinions ==
Melman has stated that he considers himself a left-wing Israeli, and that Israel must abandon the occupied territories to live in peace with a Palestinian state. However, he has also said that the Palestinians should not be given the right of return, as that would defeat the idea of a two-state solution in Israeli minds.

While supporting the peace process with the Palestinians, Melman believes that Israel must retain its strong military capabilities, including its nuclear deterrence.

Melman was described by WikiLeaks in February 2012 as an "information mule" who had "channeled tips to the Mossad", assertions that were contested by Melman in his review of his relationship with Julian Assange, whom he believes has made anti-Semitic statements.

== Awards ==
Yossi Melman was twice (in 1994 and in 2017, together with Dan Raviv) the recipient of the Simon Rockower Award for Excellence in Jewish Journalism and of the 1995 Boris Smolar Award of Excellence in International News or Feature Reporting, on behalf of the American Jewish Press Association.

In 2003 together with a few other members of the ICIJ investigative team he has received a special award for their coverage "Making a Killing: The Business of War", a project of 11 feature articles on worldwide arms dealers, oil and diamond merchants in Third World countries.

In 2004 survey among Haaretz readers, Melman was selected as the Most Outstanding and Interesting Writer.

In 2007 participated together with ICIJ reporters Michael Bilton, Prangtip Daorueng, Ignacio Gomez, Andreas Harsono, Alain Lallemand, Mutegi Njau, Paul Radu, Gerardo Reyes and Leo Sisti in an investigatory project Collateral Damage: Human Rights and Military Aid After 9/11. The project was nominated for the Online News Association Awards.

In 2008, Melman won an award from the Investigative Reporters and Editors Association (IRE) for his report on a Jordanian Palestinian held illegally by American, Israeli and Jordanian security services.

In 2009 he received the Sokolov Award, Israel's foremost award for journalism, on account of his investigative work and breaking news about the Israeli security establishment.

== Published work ==
External videos
- Booknotes interview with Melman and Dan Raviv on Every Spy a Prince, August 5, 1990, C-SPAN

- The Master Terrorist: The True Story of Abu-Nidal, translated by Shmuel Himelstein (Adama Books, 1986), ISBN 0-915361-52-3
- The Imperfect Spies: The History of Israeli Intelligence (Sidgwick & Jackson, 1989), ASIN B0007BR81Q
- Behind the Uprising: Israelis, Jordanians, and Palestinians, written with Dan Raviv (Greenwood Press, 1989), ISBN 0-313-26787-1
- The New Israelis: An Intimate View of a Changing People (Carol Publishing Corporation, 1992), ISBN 1-55972-129-4
- Friends in Deed: Inside the U.S.-Israel Alliance, written with Dan Raviv (Hyperion Books, 1994) ISBN 0-7868-6006-5
- Every Spy a Prince: The Complete History of Israel's Intelligence Community, written with Dan Raviv (Houghton Mifflin, 1990) ISBN 0-395-47102-8
- Spies Against Armageddon: Inside Israel's Secret Wars, written with Dan Raviv (Levant Books, 2012), ISBN 978-0985437817
- The Nuclear Sphinx of Tehran: Mahmoud Ahmadinajed and the State of Iran written with Meir Javedanfar (Caroll&Graf, 2007) ASIN B001G8WGPC ISBN 0786721065
