= The Land of Painted Caves =

2011 novel by Jean M. Auel

- First edition (US)
- Author: Jean M. Auel
- Cover artist: Rob Wood
- Language: English
- Series: Earth's Children
- Genre: Historical novel Speculative fiction Alternate history
- Published: March 29, 2011
- Publisher: Crown (US); Hodder & Stoughton (UK)
- Publication place: United States
- Media type: Print (Hardback)
- Pages: 768 pp
- ISBN: 0-517-58051-9 (hardback)
- Preceded by: The Shelters of Stone
- Followed by: n/a

The Land of Painted Caves is a historical fiction novel by Jean M. Auel published in March 2011. It is the sequel to The Shelters of Stone – published 9 years earlier – and is the sixth and final book in the Earth's Children series. It describes Ayla's life among the Zelandonii, and her training to become one of their spiritual leaders.

== Plot ==
In this three-part book, Ayla is 20 (in part 1), about 23 (in part 2) and 26 (in part 3) and is training to become a spiritual leader for the Zelandonii. Most of the first and second parts of the book involve Ayla's acolyte training to become Zelandoni. The third part of the book contains most of the action of the story and plot line.

In the first part, Ayla is at a Summer Meeting and she begins to learn what an acolyte does. Ayla and the First decide to start Ayla's Donier Tour - a tour of the sacred caves in the wider region. Jondalar, Jonayla, their animals and many others decide to travel. The second part is mainly about the caves they visit. In many of the Sacred caves the Ancients, the people before the Zelandonii, left drawings. Ayla meets many other Zelandoni and one of them gives her a pouch of dried herbs smelling faintly of mint. Ayla also discovers that the Clan visit some of the sacred caves as well.

In the third part of the book, Ayla is marking the passage of the sun and moon's phases as part of her training as an acolyte. One night she is distracted and decides to share Pleasures with Jondalar, starting a baby. However, most of her Cave leaves for the Summer Meeting, but Ayla stays behind until Midsummer so she can finish her observation of the celestial bodies. During this time she takes care of Marthona, her mother-in-law, as well as the others in her Cave. One night Ayla makes some mint tea, actually the dried herb mixture given to her in the second part of the book, and is Called. If an acolyte is Called, then she will be tested by the Zelandonia, and initiated into the Zelandonia if the Calling is true. Ayla puts down her drink and runs along a river into a cave, where she spends the next three days hallucinating. Wolf wakes her from her visions, and she finds herself in the dark cave. She allows Wolf to lead her out of the cave, but not before finding a bag hidden there by Madroman, an unskilled acolyte who faked his Calling, and who has had a deep-seated hatred of Jondalar since adolescence.

Outside are people from her Cave who were worried about her absence, and it is discovered that Ayla miscarried. She spends the next few days recovering from her experience and helps deliver a friend's baby. After delivering the baby, Ayla travels to the Summer Meeting. Upon her arrival, she finds Jondalar sharing Pleasures with Marona (Marona being Jondalar's bitter ex-girlfriend whom he abandoned to go travelling in the second book, and who actively and spitefully caused Ayla much difficulty when she first arrived at Jondalar's home). This leaves a rift between Ayla and Jondalar. She turns Madroman's bag over to the Zelandonia, and he is rejected from their ranks for his attempted deception. Ayla is accepted into the Zelandonia and attempts to use a dangerous hallucinogenic root as part of her initiation - one that was greatly feared by her first mentor, Mamut. The rift with Jondalar is only healed when he manages to call her back from the deathlike coma induced by the root.

The spiritual knowledge Ayla's Calling brings to the community is that men are active in the conception of a baby during 'Pleasures', which leads to the start of recognized fatherhood and that men have purpose on earth equal to that of women, and subsequently leads to the need for monogamous relationships to reduce jealousy/possessiveness over sexual partners and for fathers to take responsibility for children, thus shaping this prehistoric culture further to match our current one.
