= The Mammoth Hunters =

1985 fiction novel by Jean M. Auel

- Author: Jean M. Auel
- Language: English
- Series: Earth's Children
- Genre: Historical novel
- Publisher: Crown
- Publication date: December 21, 1985
- Publication place: United States
- Media type: Print (Hardback & Paperback)
- Pages: 768
- ISBN: 0-517-55627-8
- OCLC: 12371377
- Dewey Decimal: 813/.54 19
- LC Class: PS3551.U36 M3 1986
- Preceded by: The Valley of Horses
- Followed by: The Plains of Passage

The Mammoth Hunters is an historical fiction novel by Jean M. Auel released in 1985. It is the sequel to The Valley of Horses and third in the Earth's Children series.

== Plot summary ==
This book picks up where The Valley of Horses ends; Ayla and Jondalar meet a group known as the Mamutoi, or Mammoth Hunters, with whom they live for a period of time. As the group's name suggests, their hosts rely on mammoth not only for food but also for building materials and a number of other commodities - and indeed for spiritual sustenance. The protagonists make their home with the Lion Camp of the Mammoth Hunters, which features a number of respected Mamutoi. Wisest of their nation is Old Mamut, their eldest shaman and the leader of the entire Mamutoi priesthood, who becomes Ayla's mentor and colleague in the visionary and esoteric fields of thought. Observing Ayla's affinity with horses and wolves, Mamut begins to introduce her into the ranks of the Mamuti (mystics).

Mamut is also one of the first to become aware of Ayla's unique upbringing. Many years ago, while on the Journey that all young men take for a rite of passage, he broke his arm, and was healed by the medicine woman of Ayla's Neanderthal clan (the grandmother of Ayla's adoptive mother Iza). This story is referenced in Clan of the Cave Bear as the Neanderthals rationalize Ayla's behavior in terms of what they know about "the Others" (Cro-Magnon). Mamut learned some of the Clan sign language during that stay, and became aware of the fact that the Clan are human (as opposed to other animals, as is the common opinion of most of his people).

Also within the Lion Camp is a six-year-old boy named Rydag who, like Ayla's lost son Durc, is half Clan and half Other. He was adopted by the headman's mate, Nezzie, when his mother died giving birth to him. He cannot speak, having the same vocal limitations as the Clan, but he also has their ancestral memories. Ayla quickly discovers this and teaches him, and the rest of the Lion Camp, the Clan sign language. Rydag is a sickly child, having a heart defect which limits him from even playing like the other children of the Camp. Many Mamutoi regard him as an animal, but Ayla and the Lion Camp are vehement in their defence of him. Rydag's intelligence, maturity and wit endear him to Jondalar as well, who learns to overcome his cultural prejudice towards Clan and half-Clan people.

Jondalar, a Zelandoni, is a foreigner among the Mamutoi, and Ayla's acceptance in their society makes him feel separated from her. The primary conflict is a love triangle between Jondalar, Ayla, and Lion Camp member Ranec. Ayla is attracted to Ranec, shares "Pleasures" with him a few times, and comes close to mating him before several last-minute revelations reunite the former pair. At the end of this novel, Ayla and Jondalar leave for the year-long return journey to Jondalar's people, the Zelandonii.

== Characters ==
=== Lion Camp Earthlodge ===
- Lion Hearth
  - Talut (Headman)
  - Nezzie
    - Danug
    - Latie
    - Rugie
    - Rydag (half-Clan)
- Fox Hearth
  - Wymez
    - Ranec
- Mammoth Hearth
  - Mamut (shaman)
  - Ayla
  - Jondalar
- Reindeer Hearth
  - Manuv
    - Tronie
    - Tornec
      - Nuvie
      - Hartal
- Crane Hearth
  - Crozie
    - Fralie
    - Frebec
      - Crisavec
      - Tasher
      - Bectie
- Aurochs Hearth
  - Tulie (Headwoman)
  - Barzec
    - Deegie
    - Druwez
    - Brinan
    - Tusie
    - Tarneg
