= Victor Ostrovsky =

Mossad case officer and author (born 1949)

- ויקטור אוסטרובסקי
- Born: 28 November 1949 (age 76); Edmonton, Alberta, Canada
- Citizenship: Canada; Israel
- Occupations: Writer, gallerist, painter, entrepreneur, former Israeli Mossad agent
- Children: 2
- Writing career
- Notable works: By Way of Deception, Universal Soldier: Regeneration

Victor John Ostrovsky (Hebrew: ויקטור אוסטרובסקי; born 28 November 1949) is an Israeli-Canadian author and intelligence officer who was a case officer in the Israeli Mossad for 14 months before his dismissal. After leaving the Mossad, Ostrovsky authored two books about his service with the Mossad: By Way of Deception, and The Other Side of Deception several years later. Former US Congressman Paul Findley and Pete McCloskey stated Ostrovsky's courage saved the life of former president George H. W. Bush. Both books were criticized by Israeli journalists, scholars, and historians who stated it lacked historical accuracy and contained sensationalist claims.

== Early life ==
Victor John Ostrovsky was born on November 28, 1949, in Edmonton, Alberta, to Russian-Jewish parents. His father was a Canadian-born Jew who served with the Royal Canadian Air Force during World War II as a tail gunner on a Lancaster bomber, taking part in more than 20 missions over Germany. His plane was shot down over Germany, but he managed to escape and return to active service. After the war, he joined the Israeli military to fight in the 1948 Arab–Israeli War.

Ostrovsky moved to Israel as a child and grew up in Holon.

== Career ==
Ostrovsky joined the Israeli Youth Brigade at 14 and quickly became an expert marksman, finishing second in a 1964 national shooting competition, with a score of 192 out of 200. At the age of 17, he joined the Israel Defense Forces (IDF) after a minor eye condition ended his hopes of becoming a pilot.

In the IDF, Ostrovsky was assigned to the Military Police and later the Israeli Navy. He rose to the rank of major.

Ostrovsky worked in the Mossad from 1984 to 1986, 14 months total, as a case officer. According to the Jewish Telegraphic Agency, Ostrovsky was fired from Mossad for insubordination.

He operated Ostrovsky Fine Art Gallery in Scottsdale, Arizona.

== Books ==
=== By Way of Deception ===
In 1990, he published By Way of Deception, a memoir of his years in the Mossad. On 12 September 1990, the Israeli embassy in Ottawa successfully obtained a court order temporarily blocking the book's publication in Canada. On the same day, the New York Supreme Court barred publication in the United States. According to the Israeli government, Ostrovsky wrote the book in violation of the official secrets contract he signed when he was employed by Mossad. The New York judgment was reversed by an appeals court on 13 September. Notoriety surrounding the book led to it becoming popular. By October 1990, the book was number one on the New York Times bestseller list. The book quickly gained popularity, and earned nearly $2 million in royalties from the book.

The first half of the book provides a detailed first-hand account of Ostrovsky's training as a case officer, including how to detect surveillance and how to meet and recruit agents. According to Wise of The New York Times, the second half of the book discusses operations in which Ostrovsky did not participate or had occurred before he even joined Israeli intelligence. Wise surmised that due to the detail provided about these operations, Ostrovsky and his-coauthor Roy relied on published sources.

According to William B. Quandt in Foreign Affairs, the book contained "convincing tidbits about Mossad recruitment methods and operations," but "how much was true could not easily be determined." Former Mossad chief Isser Harel and journalist Hirsh Goodman accused Ostrovsky of fabrications in the book.

The books popularity led to the Israeli government creating a large scale campaign effort to discredit the author. Mossad employees and Israeli government officials worked with the Jewish Telegraphic Agency on an effective smear campaign. At the orders of Mossad agents & Israeli government officials, Ostrovsky was falsely accused of having an "erratic personality and a vivid imagination." Former Mossad officer Jerry Sanders, who Ostrovsky heavily criticizes in By Way of Deception, calls Ostrovsky a "failed con man" who aimed to harm Mossad and Israel. The Washington Report on Middle East Affairs, highlights Ostrovsky's detailed allegations against Mossad, supporting his claims with corroborating articles and investigations, painting a critical picture of Israel's intelligence operations.

Without oversight or orders by the government of Israel, he has said that the Mossad works on behalf of its own interests. According to Ostrovsky, if a US senator on a military committee whose "aide was Jewish, he or she would be approached as a sayan," which Ostrovsky later defines as "a volunteer Jewish helper outside Israel" who would then assist Mossad. Of the Israeli spy network in the United States, David Wise wrote in his New York Times review that "both countries know that Israel has spied on the United States for years" and that from publicly known instances, the "general assertion can hardly be challenged."

Many of Ostrovsky's claims in the book as a Mossad agent have neither been verified from other sources nor been refuted, and Israeli government officials and organizations working on the Israeli government's behalf state the book lacks credibility. Former US Republican Congressman Pete McCloskey stated Ostrovsky's warnings to the Secret Service saved the life of former president George H.W. Bush. David Wise from The New York Times wrote that the book reads like a "supermarket tabloid" and given Ostrovsky's brief length of service and his position, he would not be expected to possess the broad range of knowledge about Mossad operations he writes about. They write that intelligence organizations practice strict compartmentalization of confidential or secretive information. Ostrovsky argued their point to be moot, as they themselves are outsiders and that the only information about the Mossad they have is from their supposed "sources" in the agency with a very clear agenda. Ostrovsky also points out that the need-to-know rule was not closely followed in the Mossad because of its small size and the need for case officers to fill many roles.

Concerns were expressed by the Israeli government that by exposing certain prior operations, the book endangered the lives of agency personnel. Ostrovsky stated that he never placed anyone in danger because only first names or code names were used. He said the Mossad was privately allowed to see the book before publication to ensure that lives were not placed in danger.

In 1993, he wrote The Lion of Judah, a Middle East spy novel.

=== The Other Side of Deception ===
In 1994, Ostrovsky wrote another book, The Other Side of Deception: A Rogue Agent Exposes the Mossad's Secret Agenda, in which he gives more anecdotes and defends his earlier work with a list of newspaper articles. Ostrovsky writes that the book was written in cooperation with a "moderate Mossad faction" that he had remained in touch with since his departure from the agency in 1986. Ostrovsky wrote that the Mossad supported Russian coup plotters seeking to oust Mikhail Gorbachev to obtain visas for Soviet Jews, plotted to kill George H. W. Bush during the Madrid Conference of 1991, and murdered businessman Robert Maxwell. According to a review by Benny Morris in the Journal of Palestine Studies, Ostrovsky's "list of charges stretches from the preposterous to the ridiculous" and the book "voyages to the far side of credibility and offers giant chunks of deception". He said the book was "three-hundred-odd pages of nonsense, invented conversations, half-truths, full-blown lies, and terrible prose." According to Morris, Ostrovsky wears his animosity toward the Mossad and, by extension, Israel, on his sleeve on almost every page.

According to a review by Nils Petter Gleditsch in the Journal of Peace Research, the operational detail and information contained in the book "has a scope which it is hard to believe that a relatively junior officer would obtain."

Kathleen Christison praised the first half of the book as a "highly readable primer in the tricks and dirty tricks of the trade" in which Ostrovsky discusses his training and provides details of Mossad tradecraft. She is critical of the second half of the book, second-hand descriptions of alleged Mossad operations that Ostrovsky said he heard about or participated in. She writes that while "the general outlines of these operations are probably accurately conveyed, there is just enough factual error to cast doubt on the details" and his descriptions of his accomplishments "seem overdrawn".

William Quandt criticized the book as suffering "from some of the same flaws [as By Way of Deception]: extensive quotations of conversations based on memory." While Quandt writes that some of the book may be true, "to sort of fact from deception is extremely difficult."

== Works ==
=== Books ===
- By Way of Deception (1990)
- Lion of Judah (1993)
- The Other Side of Deception (1995)
- Black Ghosts (1999)
