= The Valley of Horses =

1982 fiction novel by Jean M. Auel

- First edition
- Author: Jean M. Auel
- Language: English
- Series: Earth's Children
- Genre: Historical novel Speculative fiction Alternate history
- Published: April 13, 1982 Crown
- Publication place: United States
- Media type: Print (Hardback & Paperback)
- Pages: 502 pp
- ISBN: 0-517-54489-X (hardback)
- OCLC: 8389418
- Dewey Decimal: 813/.54 19
- LC Class: PS3551.U36 V3 1982
- Preceded by: The Clan of the Cave Bear
- Followed by: The Mammoth Hunters

The Valley of Horses is a historical fiction novel by Jean M. Auel. It is the sequel to The Clan of the Cave Bear and second in the Earth's Children series.

== Plot summary ==
The book starts off from the events at the end of The Clan of the Cave Bear detailing the life of a young Cro-Magnon woman named Ayla who has just been exiled from the Clan, the band of Neanderthals who had raised her from early childhood. Ayla now searches for her own people, whom the Clan refer to as "the Others".

In a parallel narrative, Jondalar, a young Cro-Magnon man of the Ninth Cave of the Zelandonii, accompanies his impetuous younger half-brother Thonolan on a traditional rite of passage called the Great Journey. In these episodes, we learn of the Cro-Magnon's paleolithic nature religion, centered on the worship of the Great Mother of All, and follow their adventures and sexual exploits. It is also through these episodes that the animosity, verging on hatred, between the Others and the Clan (whom they refer to derogatorily as "flatheads") is introduced. The Others have repeatedly persecuted the Clan, taking land and resources, but justify it by classing them as animals. However, over the course of his adventures, Jondalar starts to question this prejudice, noting that no other animals have fire, tools or communicate intelligently, nor are they actively hated or attacked-as-sport by his people.

Ayla, alone and ritually ostracized from the only people she has ever known, travels steadily from the Black Sea peninsular home of her former tribe north for around half a year until finding the book's titular valley sunk deep into the windy landscape of the periglacial loess steppes in Ukraine. Worried that she might never find the Others, she begins to prepare for winter. Finding a suitable cave and many conveniences in the valley, she establishes a comfortable but lonely life there.

Her desire for companionship leads her to tame a filly whose mother she had killed, naming her Whinney. She also takes in and treats an injured cave lion cub, which she names Baby. Through her love and their trust in her, she is able to train Whinney and Baby to assist her with hunting and gathering. Ayla is also able to give and receive love from these animals, saving her from her loneliness.

In the course of their journey, Jondalar and Thonolan have met women and hope to settle with them, but Thonolan's mate dies in childbirth and Jondalar feels he is not really in love with his woman friend. They continue on their journey and meet up with the Mamutoi people, planning to join them later in the year.

Jondalar and Ayla meet when Thonolan is killed by a cave lion—Baby, now fully grown and with a mate of his own. Ayla heals Jondalar's injuries and they begin to learn to communicate and get to know each other. Jondalar overcomes his inbred prejudice against the Clan and Ayla learns that all her peculiarities which confused and angered the Clan are actually fully accepted and encouraged by the Others.

The two fall in love as the book nears its end, and decide to leave the Valley of Horses to explore regions around the valley Ayla has not yet investigated. This is when they come upon the Mamutoi, known as The Mammoth Hunters.
