= Michael Chapman (cinematographer) =

American cinematographer (1935–2020)

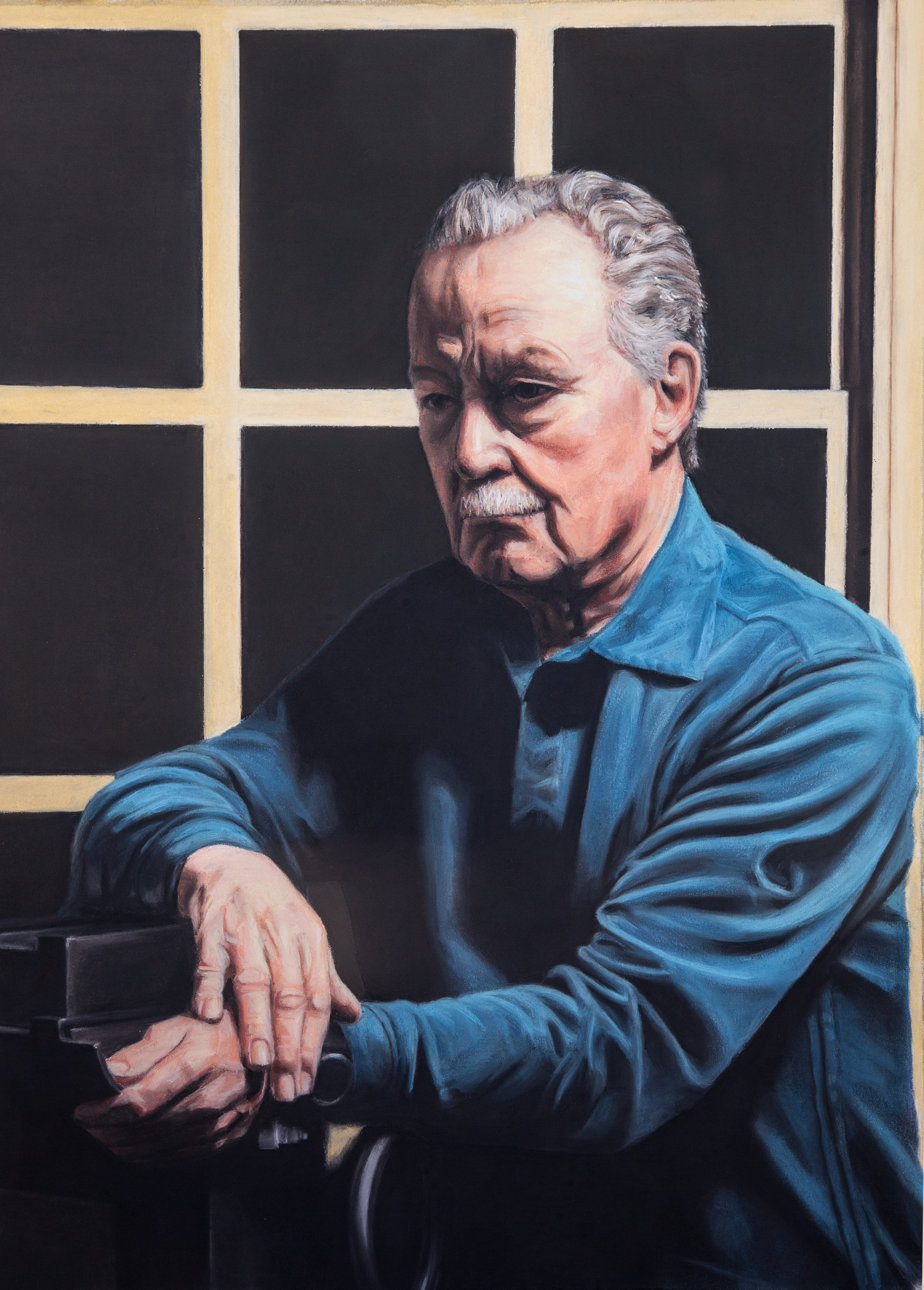
- The Portrait of Michael Chapman 2020 - Chalk on paper 36" x 22"
- Born: Michael Crawford Chapman; November 21, 1935; New York City, New York, U.S.
- Died: September 20, 2020 (aged 84); Los Angeles, California, U.S.
- Occupations: Cinematographer; film director
- Years active: 1968–2007
- Spouse: Amy Holden Jones

Michael Crawford Chapman, ASC (November 21, 1935 – September 20, 2020) was an American cinematographer and film director, known for his work on many films of the American New Wave during the 1970s and the 1980s. He was twice nominated for the Academy Award for Best Cinematography, for Raging Bull (1980) and The Fugitive (1993). He received the American Society of Cinematographers' Lifetime Achievement Award in 2004.

== Early life and education ==
Chapman was born in New York City in 1935, but raised in Wellesley, Massachusetts, a suburb of Boston, without much of an interest in film. As a youth, he was more interested in sports than photography or painting. He graduated from high school at Phillips Andover, a college preparatory school in Andover, Massachusetts. After high school, he attended Columbia College, where he majored in English. Upon his graduation, he worked temporarily as a brakeman for the Erie Lackawanna Railroad in the Midwest. In 1958, he was drafted into the U.S. Army, where he served in the Signal Corps stationed in New Jersey and Thule Air Base in Greenland.

Chapman's father-in-law, Joe Brun, got him his first job in the industry: working as an assistant cameraman and focus puller on commercials, as there were not enough feature films being shot in New York at the time.

== Career ==
Chapman began his film career as a camera operator, distinguishing himself on Francis Ford Coppola's The Godfather (1972) and Steven Spielberg's Jaws (1975) before making the leap to cinematographer. He fondly remembered his time as an operator and called it one of the best jobs in the movie business because "you get to see the film before anyone else does!"

As a cinematographer, he became known for his two collaborations with Martin Scorsese: Taxi Driver (1976) and Raging Bull (1980). Chapman was also the cinematographer for the remake of Invasion of the Body Snatchers (1978). He and Scorsese were huge fans of The Band, and Chapman served as the principal cinematographer for their documentary on The Band, called The Last Waltz (1978). With nine cameras shooting at once, Chapman remembered that "the strategy for filming all of their songs was planned out in enormous detail."

Chapman's style tended to feature high contrasts and an aggressive use of strong colors. He was also adept at setting up complex camera movements quickly and improvising on the set. This style was epitomized in the boxing sequences in Raging Bull, during which the camera was often strapped to an actor through improvised rigs. His bold use of black-and-white cinematography on Raging Bull proved particularly difficult and earned Chapman his first Academy Award nomination. As with his work on Jaws, Chapman used a handheld camera to shoot much of the film.

Besides his work with Scorsese, Chapman worked as Director of Photography for directors Hal Ashby, Philip Kaufman, Martin Ritt, Robert Towne, Michael Caton-Jones, Andrew Davis, and Ivan Reitman. He occasionally made small cameos in films that he shot; he had also directed several films of his own, the best known being All the Right Moves (1983), starring Tom Cruise in one of his earliest roles.

In 1987, Chapman collaborated again with Scorsese on the 18-minute short film that served as the music video for Michael Jackson's Bad.

Chapman also shot a string of comedies in the late 1980s and early 1990s, such as Ghostbusters II and Kindergarten Cop, and admitted that he did not need to alter his style very much. But he has said, "On comedies, I use a little more fill light; you tend to create a lit atmosphere where the performers can be at home, where they can move around…without having to hit a precise mark." He became a member of the American Society of Cinematographers (ASC) in 1995.

His final film was Bridge to Terabithia (2007). According to the DVD commentary, Chapman planned to retire after the film was finished, saying he would like to have the last film he shot be a good one.

== Personal life ==
Chapman was married to screenwriter Amy Holden Jones. His father-in-law, Joe Brun, was an Oscar-nominated cinematographer who had emigrated from France in the early 20th century.

He stated later in his life that he no longer watched films directed by frequent collaborators Martin Scorsese or Steven Spielberg, as he knew their general style would not change much. "Unless a director makes some huge sea change in what he does, that the work, the mechanical work, is going to be vaguely the same — or of the same school, anyway — but what changes is the intelligence and passion behind it in the script." He also admitted that his preferred method was to watch movies at home and that he rarely, if ever, went to a theater any more.

== Death ==
Chapman died from congestive heart failure on September 20, 2020, at his home in Los Angeles.

== Filmography ==
=== Cinematographer ===
Film

Year	Title	Director
1973	The Last Detail	Hal Ashby
1974	The White Dawn	Philip Kaufman
1976	Taxi Driver	Martin Scorsese
1976	The Front	Martin Ritt
1976	The Next Man	Richard C. Sarafian
1978	Fingers	James Toback
1978	Invasion of the Body Snatchers	Philip Kaufman
1978	Shoot the Sun Down	David Leeds
1979	Hardcore	Paul Schrader
1979	The Wanderers	Philip Kaufman
1980	Raging Bull	Martin Scorsese
1982	Personal Best	Robert Towne
1982	Dead Men Don't Wear Plaid	Carl Reiner
1983	The Man with Two Brains	Carl Reiner
1987	The Lost Boys	Joel Schumacher
1988	Shoot to Kill	Roger Spottiswoode
1988	Scrooged	Richard Donner
1989	Ghostbusters II	Ivan Reitman
1990	Quick Change	Howard Franklin; Bill Murray
1990	Kindergarten Cop	Ivan Reitman
1991	Doc Hollywood	Michael Caton-Jones
1992	Whispers in the Dark	Christopher Crowe
1993	The Fugitive	Andrew Davis
1993	Rising Sun	Philip Kaufman
1996	Primal Fear	Gregory Hoblit
1996	Space Jam	Joe Pytka
1998	Six Days, Seven Nights	Ivan Reitman
1999	The Story of Us	Rob Reiner
1999	The White River Kid	Arne Glimcher
2000	The Watcher	Joe Charbanic
2001	Evolution	Ivan Reitman
2004	House of D	David Duchovny
2004	Eulogy	Michael Clancy
2004	Suspect Zero	E. Elias Merhige
2006	Hoot	Wil Shriner
2007	Bridge to Terabithia	Gábor Csupó

TV movies

Year	Title	Director
1975	Death Be Not Proud	Donald Wrye
1988	Gotham	Lloyd Fonvielle

Miniseries

Year	Title	Director
1978	King	Abby Mann

Documentary film

Year	Title	Director	Notes
1978	The Last Waltz	Martin Scorsese	Concert film
1978	American Boy: A Profile of Steven Prince	Martin Scorsese	

Music video

Year	Title	Artist	Director
1987	Bad	Michael Jackson	Martin Scorsese

=== Director ===
Film

- All the Right Moves (1983)
- The Clan of the Cave Bear (1986)
- The Viking Sagas (1995) (Also story writer)

TV movie

- Annihilator (1986)

Music video

- Dare Me, by The Pointer Sisters (1985)

Concert film

- Peter Gabriel: Live in Athens 1987 (2013)

== Awards and nominations ==
Year	Association	Category	Title	Result
1980	Academy Awards	Best Cinematography	Raging Bull	Nominated
1993	Academy Awards	Best Cinematography	The Fugitive	Nominated
1993	American Society of Cinematographers	Outstanding Achievement in Cinematography	The Fugitive	Nominated
2003	American Society of Cinematographers	Lifetime Achievement Award		Won
1988	CableACE Award	Best Cinematography	Gotham	Nominated
2016	Camerimage	Lifetime Achievement Award		Won
1980	National Society of Film Critics	Best Cinematography	Raging Bull	Won
1975	Primetime Emmy Awards	Outstanding Cinematography	Death Be Not Proud	Nominated

== Bibliography ==
- Silberg, Jon. "Honoring a (Reluctant) Vanguard." American Cinematographer February 2004: ASC. Print.
- "Announcing the 2016 Camerimage Lifetime Achievement Award Recipient." Camerimage. Web. 14 November 2016.
- "ASC Awards for Outstanding Achievement in Cinematography." The American Society of Cinematographers. Web. 15 November 2016.
- Lodderhose, Diana. "Cinematographer Michael Chapman Honored at Camerimage Film Festival." Variety. 6 July 2016. Web. 16 November 2016.
- Newman, Nick. "Michael Chapman Talks Restoring ‘Taxi Driver’ and the Problem with Modern Cinematography." The Film Stage. 17 November 2016. Web. 20 November 2016.
- Orr, John, and Olga Taxidou. Post-war Cinema and Modernity: A Film Reader. New York: New York UP, 2001. Print.
- "Past Awards." National Society of Film Critics. 30 August 2015. Web. 14 November 2016.
