= The Shelters of Stone =

2002 novel by Jean M. Auel

- Author: Jean M. Auel
- Language: English
- Series: Earth's Children
- Genre: Historical fiction
- Publisher: Crown
- Publication date: April 30, 2002
- Publication place: United States
- Media type: Print (Hardback & Paperback)
- Pages: 753 pp
- ISBN: 0-609-61059-7 (hardback)
- OCLC: 48892350
- Dewey Decimal: 813/.54 21
- LC Class: PS3551.U36 S54 2002
- Preceded by: The Plains of Passage
- Followed by: The Land of Painted Caves

The Shelters of Stone is a historical fiction novel by Jean M. Auel published in April 2002. It is the sequel to The Plains of Passage – published 12 years earlier – and fifth in the Earth's Children series. It describes the return of Jondalar to his homeland along with Ayla.

== Plot summary ==
Central to this book is the tension created by Ayla's healing art, her pregnancy, and the acceptance of her by Jondalar's people, the Zelandonii. Ayla was raised by Clan Neanderthals, known as "flatheads" to the Zelandonii and viewed as no better than animals. For the Zelandonii to accept Ayla they must first overcome their prejudice against the Neanderthals. Luckily for Ayla and Jondalar, some of the higher-ranking Zelandonii already have doubts of this misjudgment.

Two of their number, Echozar and Brukeval, are of partial Neanderthal ancestry and are ashamed of it. Echozar at least is pacified by Ayla's own story and by his (Echozar's) own marriage to Joplaya, Jondalar's close-cousin (half-sister). Brukeval, on the other hand, rejects his heritage utterly and refuses to listen to reason.

Jondalar's first romantic interest, Zelandoni, formerly known as Zolena, has now become the First among the spiritual leaders. She supports adopting Ayla into their society, if not least for the healing arts she brings to the cave, although Ayla also must overcome the feeling that she is uncomfortable with a full connection with the spirit world. After Ayla helps a mortally injured hunter live long enough to see his mate, the First senses that Ayla needs to be brought into the fold of the Zelandonia (mystics, named after their culture so as to identify themselves with it) so that she will be accepted as a healer by all the people of the cave.

At one point, Ayla persuades the native mothers to nurse a neglected infant, on the pretext that even a "flathead" would have done so in their place. This both shames them into agreeing (as noted by Jondalar's sister-in-law, Proleva) and educates the Zelandonii in the ways of their ex-neighbors.

Ayla is drawn ever closer to an as-yet-undetermined role in the Ninth Cave of the Zelandonii. Her knowledge of the healing arts as well as hunting force her to accept a role in the spiritual leadership of the group.

Through it all Jondalar is waiting for the summer meeting and matrimonial that will finally "tie the knot" for the two of them. This has been his ultimate goal since The Valley of Horses. Their daughter, Jonayla—named for her mother's belief that a man's "essence" creates babies, which leads to Jondalar and Ayla each being part of the baby, not just their spirits—is born sometime after this event. Not long after the birth, Ayla finally decides to become Zelandoni's acolyte, if only so that the members of the Zelandonii will accept her as a healer.

This book is set in what is now the Vézère valley, near to Les Eyzies, in the Dordogne, southwest France. It was relatively densely populated in prehistoric times, with many open cliff-top dwellings that can still be seen, some of which have been turned into tourist attractions. The national museum of prehistory is located in this valley. Ayla also discovers the world-famous cave of Lascaux, which her adopted people subsequently paint.
