= The Plains of Passage =

1990 novel by Jean M. Auel

- Author: Jean M. Auel
- Language: English
- Series: Earth's Children
- Genre: Historical novel
- Publisher: Crown
- Publication date: September 24, 1990
- Publication place: United States
- Pages: 760 pp
- ISBN: 0-517-58049-7
- OCLC: 21873762
- Dewey Decimal: 813/.54 20
- LC Class: PS3551.U36 P57 1990
- Preceded by: The Mammoth Hunters
- Followed by: The Shelters of Stone

The Plains of Passage is an historical fiction novel by Jean M. Auel published in 1990. It is the sequel to The Mammoth Hunters and fourth in the Earth's Children series.

== Plot ==
The Plains of Passage describes the journey of Ayla and Jondalar west along the Great Mother River (the Danube), from the home of The Mammoth Hunters (roughly modern Ukraine) to Jondalar's homeland (close to Les Eyzies, Dordogne, France). During this journey, Ayla meets the various peoples who live along their line of march. These meetings, the attitudes and beliefs of these groups, and Ayla's response form an essential part of the story.

As they encounter people Jondalar and his brother met on their journey eastward they have a hard time leaving them, especially after an offer to become joined with a high-ranking Sharamudoi couple. Jondalar declines the offer, giving as excuse his desire to have the lead mystic of his people search for and help his deceased brother cross over to the other side.

It concludes with Ayla and Jondalar's successful return to the Zelandonii, and Ayla's stated pregnancy, and Whinney's definite pregnancy.

== Critical response ==
Entertainment Weekly gave the novel a B+ upon its release in 1990, saying it has a "low-intensity fascination [similar to] an actual hike through the wilderness". Entertainment Weekly also claims "Auel's main strength is melodrama that has been enlisted in the service of a serious, improving message that a lot of people want to receive. In Auel's case the didactic component is a postfeminist allegory that validates Woman's new place in society, with one foot in the (hunting/ gathering) workplace and the other still solidly planted on the domestic hearth". Auel is often praised for her knowledge on the Paleolithic, and this chapter in the Earth's Children series is no exception.

== Public Response ==
"The Plains of Passage" spent weeks on the New York Times best sellers list from 1990–1991.
