= By Way of Deception =

1990 book by Victor Ostrovsky

- First edition
- Author: Victor Ostrovsky
- Language: English
- Subject: Mossad
- Publisher: Stoddart Publishing
- Publication date: 1990
- Publication place: United States
- Pages: 372
- ISBN: 0-9717595-0-2
- OCLC: 52617140
- Followed by: The Other Side of Deception

By Way of Deception: The Making and Unmaking of a Mossad Officer is a nonfiction book by a former katsa (case officer) in the Mossad, Victor Ostrovsky, and Canadian journalist and author Claire Hoy.

== Title ==
The title of the book is derived from the Hebrew motto of the Mossad at the time, from Proverbs 24:6, be-tahbūlōt ta`aseh lekhā milkhamāh (Hebrew: בתחבולות תעשה לך מלחמה), which he learned from Aharon Sherf, director of the Mossad Academy where he trained. Ostrovsky's translation was "By way of deception you shall engage in war." This is the traditional Hebrew translation. However, the New NIV Interlinear Hebrew-English Old Testament translation is "For waging war you need guidance".

Ostrovsky has stated that his name is not a pen name and that if he wanted to hide, he would not have written the book in the first place.

== Summary ==
The book starts with Ostrovsky's service in the Israel Defense Forces. After taking psychological and other preliminary tests, he rejects a potential job as a Mossad assassin but accepts a trainee katsa position.

He specifically addresses the suicide bombing of the US Marine compound in Beirut that killed several hundred US Marines in Lebanon. He says that Mossad learned of the time and location of the attack in advance through its network of informants but told only general information, without the specifics, to the US.

He attributes trafficking heroin as a source of raising funds for operations outside government regulation. He blames Mossad for assassinating Naim Khader, a PLO diplomat sent by Yasser Arafat to start peace negotiations with the Israeli government to prevent an invasion of Lebanon targeting the PLO.

Ostrovsky's allegations grew, culminating in retirement after being scapegoated for a failed attempt at capturing top PLO officials.

The second half alleges other operations between 1971 and 1985, such as Operation Sphynx in which Iraqi nuclear scientists were recruited while they were in France to gather information about Iraq's Osiraq nuclear reactor which is destroyed by an Israeli air strike in 1981.

== Israeli litigation ==
In 1990, Israel tried to stop the book sale with a preliminary injunction, arguing that publication would "endanger agents in the field". It was the first (and, to date, only) attempt of a sovereign state to stop a book from being published in the United States. Lawyers for Israel convinced Manhattan Supreme Court Justice Michael J. Dontzin to issue the injunction, preventing the publication and distribution of By Way of Deception.

On September 13, less than 48 hours after the injunction had been issued, an appeals court threw it out. For the week of 7 October 1990, the New York Times best seller list rated the book #1 on its nonfiction list.

== See also ==
- Kidon
