= Jean M. Auel =

American author (born 1936)

Jean Marie Auel
- Born: Jean Marie Untinen; February 18, 1936 (age 90); Chicago, Illinois, U.S.
- Education: University of Portland (MBA)
- Occupation: Novelist
- Spouse: Ray Bernard Auel
- Children: 5
- Writing career
- Pen name: Jean M. Untinen-Auel (Finland)
- Period: 1980–2011
- Genre: Pre-historical fiction
- Notable work: Earth's Children series
- Website: www.jeanauel.com

Jean Marie Auel (/aʊl/; née Untinen; born February 18, 1936) is a retired American writer who wrote the Earth's Children books, a series of novels set in prehistoric Europe that explores human activities during this time, and touches on the interactions of Cro-Magnon people with Neanderthals. Her books have sold more than 45 million copies worldwide.

== Early years ==
Auel was born Jean Marie Untinen in 1936 in Chicago. She is of Finnish descent, the second of five children of Neil Solomon Untinen, a housepainter, and Martha (née Wirtanen) Untinen.

Auel attended the University of Portland. While a student, she joined Mensa and worked at Tektronix as a clerk (1965–1966), a circuit-board designer (1966–1973), a technical writer (1973–1974), and a credit manager (1974–1976). She earned an MBA from the University of Portland in 1976. She received honorary degrees from her alma mater, Pacific University, Portland State University, the University of Maine and the Mount Vernon College for Women.

== Career as novelist ==
In 1977, Auel began extensive library research of the Ice Age for her first book. She joined a survival class to learn how to construct an ice cave, and learned primitive methods of making fire, tanning leather, and knapping stone from the aboriginal skills expert Jim Riggs.

The Clan of the Cave Bear was nominated for numerous literary awards, including an American Booksellers Association nomination for best first novel. It was also later adapted into a screenplay for the film of the same name.

After the sales success of her first book, Auel has been able to travel to the sites of prehistoric ruins and relics, and also to meet many of the experts with whom she had been corresponding. Her research has taken her across Europe from France to Ukraine, including most of what Marija Gimbutas called Old Europe. In 1986, she attended and co-sponsored a conference on modern human origins at the School of American Research, Santa Fe. She has developed a close friendship with Doctor Jean Clottes of France, who was responsible for the exploration and the scientific study of the Cosquer Cave discovered in 1985 and the Chauvet Cave discovered in 1994.

In October 2008, Auel was named an Officer of the Ordre des Arts et des Lettres by the French Minister of Culture and Communication.

== Works ==
By 1990, Auel's first three books in her Earth's Children series had sold more than 20 million copies worldwide and been translated into 18 languages; Crown Publishers paid Auel about $25 million for the rights to publish The Plains of Passage and the two subsequent volumes. By May 2002, on the cusp of the publication of the fifth book, the series had sold 34 million books. The sixth and final book in the series, The Land of Painted Caves, was published in 2011.

1. The Clan of the Cave Bear, 1980
2. The Valley of Horses, 1982
3. The Mammoth Hunters, 1985
4. The Plains of Passage, 1990
5. The Shelters of Stone, 2002
6. The Land of Painted Caves, 2011

== Personal life ==
Jean Marie Untinen married Ray Bernard Auel after high school. They have five children and live in Portland, Oregon, in the Goose Hollow neighborhood.
