= Prehistoric fiction =

Speculative fiction set in prehistoric times

Prehistoric fiction is both a historical fiction and a science fiction subgenre in which the story is set during the long timespan of human, and even animal, prehistory; the Paleolithic, Mesolithic and Neolithic up to the Copper Age, Bronze Age and Iron Age for Western Eurasia and North Africa, and further afield the Lithic Stage and Archaic Stage of North America. The genre has connections with speculative fiction. In narratives such as this, for instance, humans and dinosaurs are shown living together.

The paleontologist and author Björn Kurtén coined the term "paleofiction" to define his works. The contemporary genre dubbed "stonepunk" features the anachronistic use of high technology in prehistoric times. Yet prehistoric fiction can be accurate and based on hard paleontological, archeological and anthropological evidence.

== List of prehistoric fiction ==
=== Print ===
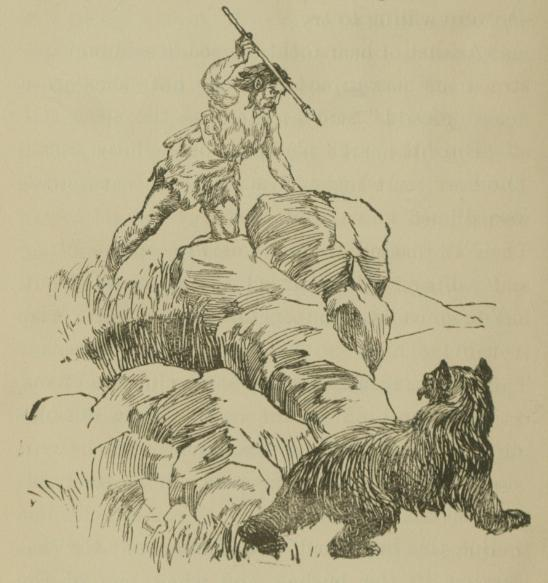
"A hunter attacking a brown bear", art from The Cave Boy of the Age of Stone, novel by Margaret A. McIntyre.

==== 19th Century ====
- Paris Before Man (1861) by Pierre Boitard
- Solutré ou les chasseurs de rennes de la France centrale (1872) by Adrien Arcelin
- The Story of Ab (1897) by Stanley Waterloo

==== 20th Century ====
- Before Adam (1906-1907) by Jack London
- The Cave Boy of the Age of Stone (1907) by Margaret A. McIntyre
- The Quest for Fire (1911) by J.-H. Rosny, Joseph Henri Honoré Boex
- The Eternal Lover (1913) by Edgar Rice Burroughs
- The Land That Time Forgot (1918) and sequels ("Caspak trilogy") by Edgar Rice Burroughs
- Fire-Hunter (1951) by Jim Kjelgaard
- Mists of Dawn (1952) by Chad Oliver
- The Inheritors (1955) by William Golding
- Warrior Scarlet (1958) by Rosemary Sutcliff
- The Boy with the Bronze Axe (1968) by Kathleen Fidler
- Sambaqui: A Novel of Pre-History (1975) by Stella Carr Ribeiro
- Sun Horse, Moon Horse (1977) by Rosemary Sutcliff
- Shifting Sands (1977) by Rosemary Sutcliff
- The Pagans Trilogy (1978–1984) by Richard Herley
- Dance of the Tiger (1978) by Björn Kurtén
- The Clan of the Cave Bear (1980) (and sequels "Earth's Children" 1980-2011) by Jean M. Auel
- Saga of Pliocene Exile (1981–1984) by Julian May
- The Books of the Named (1983–2008) by Clare Bell
- Singletusk (1984) by Björn Kurtén
- Pillar of the Sky: A Novel of Stonehenge (1985) by Cecelia Holland
- Reindeer Moon (1987) by Elizabeth Marshall Thomas
- The First Americans (1987–2000) by William Sarabande
- Wolves of the Dawn (1987) by William Sarabande
- The Gift of Stones (1988) by Jim Crace
- The Animal Wife (1990) by Elizabeth Marshall Thomas
- Ivory Carver Trilogy (1990-1994) by Sue Harrison
- North America's Forgotten Past (1990–2022) by W. Michael Gear and Kathleen O'Neal Gear
- The Hunter Returns (1991) by David Drake (expanded version of Fire-Hunter by Jim Kjelgaard)
- Raptor Red (1995) by Robert T. Bakker
- Stonehenge (1999) by Bernard Cornwell
- The Mammoth Trilogy (1999–2001) by Stephen Baxter

==== 21st Century ====
- Evolution (2003) by Stephen Baxter
- Chronicles of Ancient Darkness (2004–2009) by Michelle Paver
- Great Sky Woman: A Novel (2006) by Steven Barnes
- Darkwing (2007) by Kenneth Oppel
- Shadow Valley: A Novel (2009) by Steven Barnes
- Warrior Daughter (2009) by Janet Paisley
- The Gathering Night (2009) by Margaret Elphinstone
- Shaman: A Novel of the Ice Age (2013) by Kim Stanley Robinson
- Song Hunter (2013) by Sally Prue
- The Last Men in the North (2014) by Edward Ashton
- Siver Skin (2015) by Joan Lennon
- The Dog Master (2015) by W. Bruce Cameron
- Ivory and Bone (2016) by Julie Eshbaugh
- The Last Neanderthal (2017) by Claire Cameron
- The Eyes of the Leopard (2022) by Brian D. Hayden
- Stone Arrows: A Stone Age Adventure (Book 1 and Book 2; 2023) by Elizabeth Barber
- Circle of Days (2025) by Ken Follett

==== Short stories and collections ====
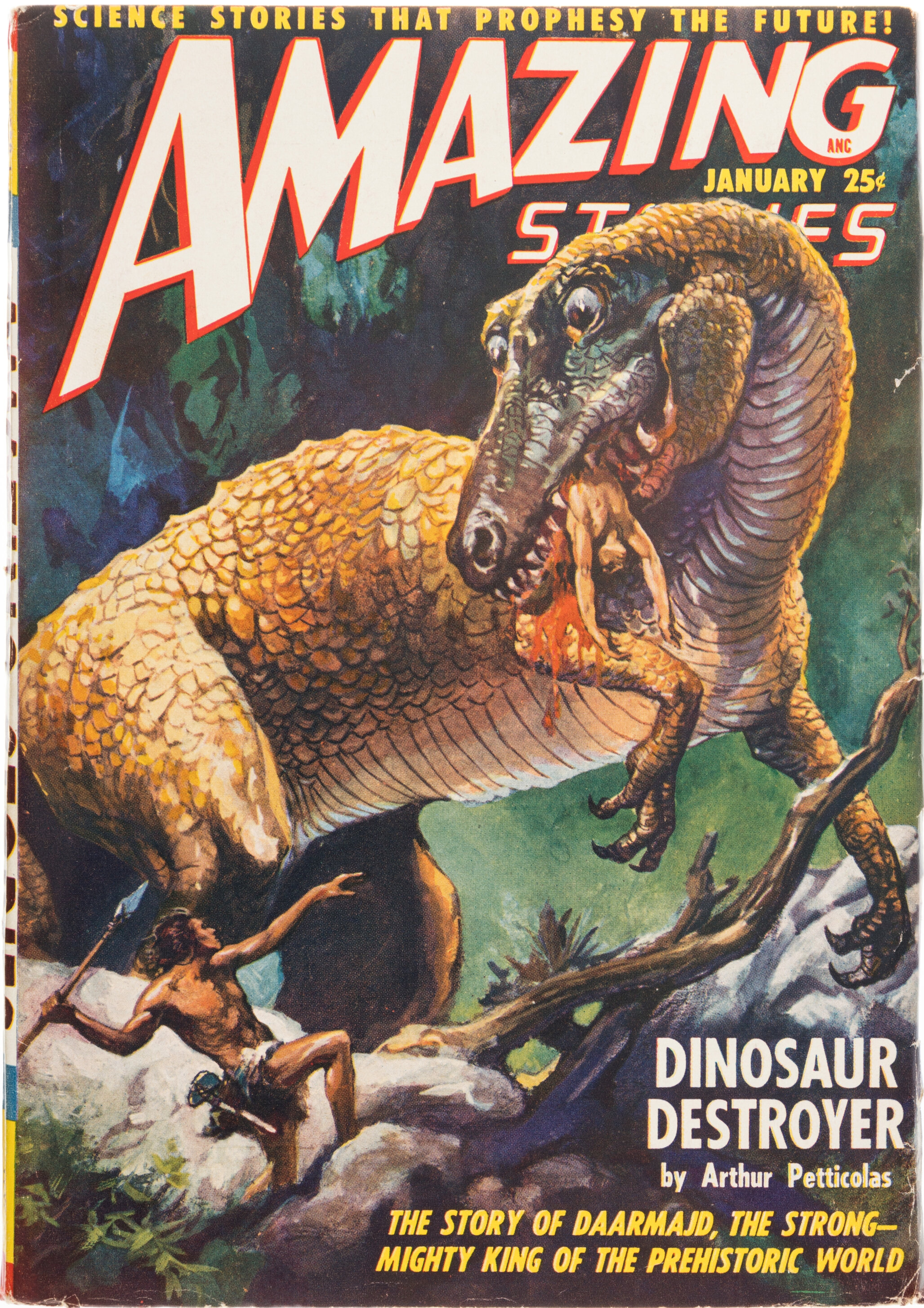
"Dinosaur Destroy" by C. M. Eddy Jr., Amazing Stories, January 1949 cover art by J. Allen St. John

- The Scorpion God (1971) (two of its three short stories are set in prehistory) by William Golding
- A Story of the Stone Age (1897) by H. G. Wells
- The Grisly Folk (1921) by H. G. Wells
- Spear and Fang (1925) by Robert E. Howard
- With Weapons of Stone (1924) by C. M. Eddy Jr.
- Arhl-a of the Caves (1925) by C. M. Eddy Jr.

==== Graphic novels and comics ====
- Sláine series (1983 onwards) by Pat Mills and Angela Kincaid
- Prehistoric Peeps (1893) by Edward Tennyson
- Anthro (1968) by Howard Post
- Devil Dinosaur (1978) by Jack Kirby
- Rahan series (1969–2010) by Roger Lécureux, André Chéret, and Jean-François Lécureux
- Tor series (1953–1993) by Joe Kubert
- The Cavern Clan series, Mauricio de Sousa and others (1961–present), graphic novels include Piteco – Ingá (2013), by Shiko and Piteco – Fogo (2019), Piteco – Presas (2021) and Piteco – Conquista (2026) by Eduardo Ferigato.
- Mezolith: Stone Age Dreams and Nightmares #1 (2010) by Ben Haggarty and Adam Brockbank
- Mezolith: Stone Age Dreams and Nightmares #2 (2014) by Ben Haggarty and Adam Brockbank

=== Film and television series ===
In chronological order:

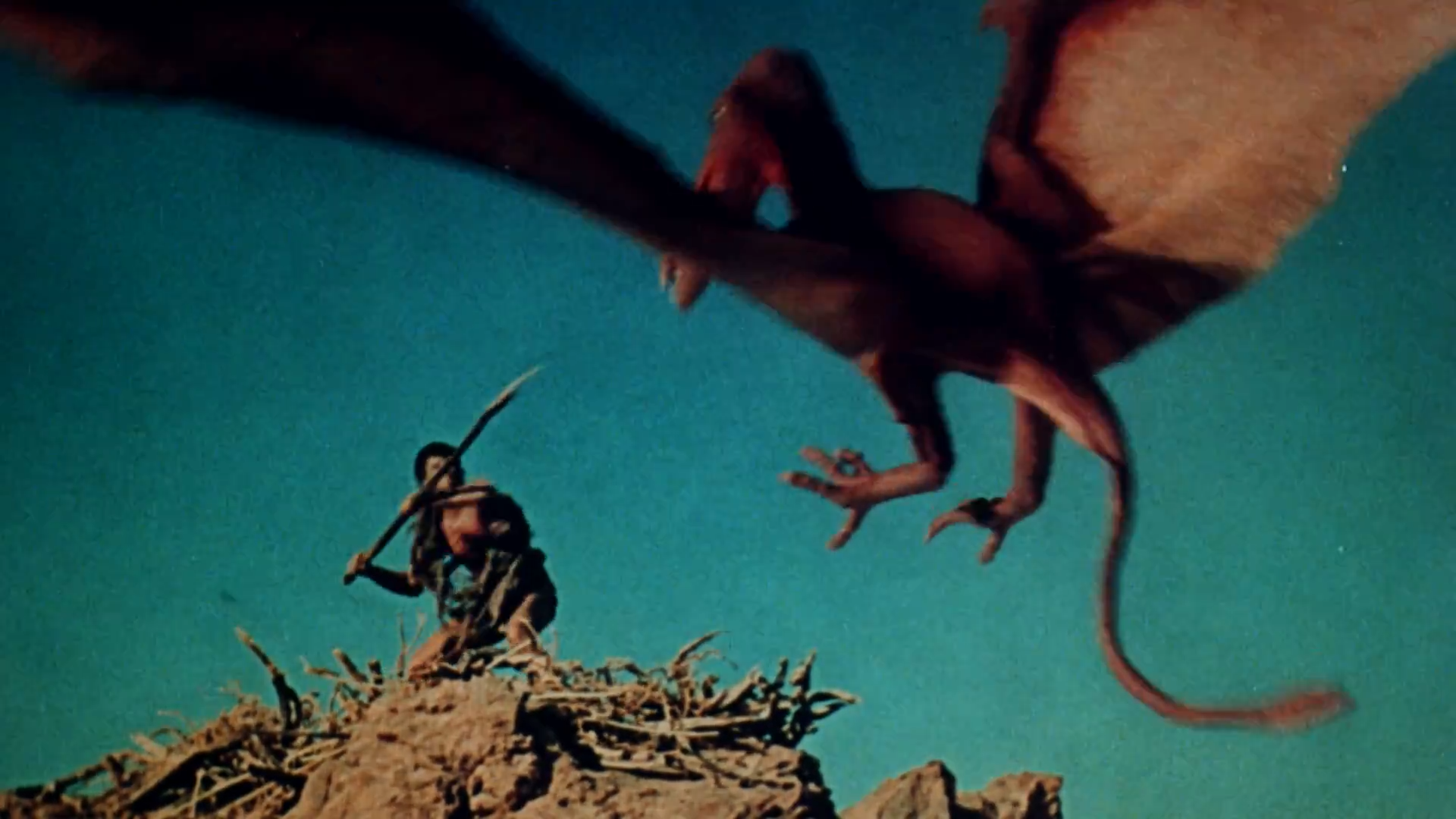
Scene from When Dinosaurs Ruled the Earth

- One Million B.C. (1940)
- The Flintstones (1960–1966)
- One Million Years B.C. (1966)
- Mighty Mightor (1967–1968)
- 2001: A Space Odyssey (1968)
- Korg: 70,000 B.C. (1974–1975)
- Caveman (1981)
- Quest for Fire (1981)
- The Clan of the Cave Bear (1986)
- Pathfinder (1987)
- Missing Link (1988)
- Rapa-Nui (1994)
- The 13th Warrior (1999)
- Atanarjuat: The Fast Runner (2001)
- RRRrrrr!!! (2004)
- Ten Canoes (2006)
- 10,000 BC (2008)
- Year One (2009)
- Ao: The Last Hunter (2010)
- The Dead Lands (2014)
- Iceman (2017)
- Alpha (2018)
- Primal (2019)
- Out of Darkness (2022)
- 65 (2023)

=== Games ===
==== Tabletop games ====
- GURPS Ice Age (1989) by Kirk Wilson Tate
- Stone Age (2008) Michael Tummelhofer
- Cavemaster (2012) by Jeff Dee and Talzhemir Mrr
- Würm (2017) by Emmanuel Roudier, Olivier Castan, and Éric Gilleron

==== Video games ====
- NetHack (1987)
- UnReal World (1992)
- Far Cry Primal (2016)
- Ancestors: The Humankind Odyssey (2019)
- Roots of Pacha (2023)

== See also ==
- Caveman
- Historical fiction
- Lost World (genre)
- Stonepunk
