= Neanderthals in popular culture =

Neanderthals have been depicted in popular culture since the early 20th century. Early depictions conveyed and perpetuated notions of proverbially crude, low-browed cavemen; since the latter part of the 20th century, some depictions have modeled more sympathetic reconstructions of the genus Homo in the Middle Paleolithic era. In popular idiom, people sometimes use the word "Neanderthal" as an insult - to suggest that a person so designated combines a deficiency in intelligence and a tendency to use brute force. The term may also imply that a person is old-fashioned or attached to outdated ideas, much in the same way as the terms "dinosaur" or "Yahoo".

A number of sympathetic literary portrayals of Neanderthals exist, as in the 1955 novel The Inheritors by William Golding, Isaac Asimov's 1958 short story "The Ugly Little Boy", or the more serious treatment by Finnish paleontologist Björn Kurtén (in several works including Dance of the Tiger (1978)) - compare British psychologist Stan Gooch's non-fiction works on the hybrid-origin theory of humans.

== Origins ==
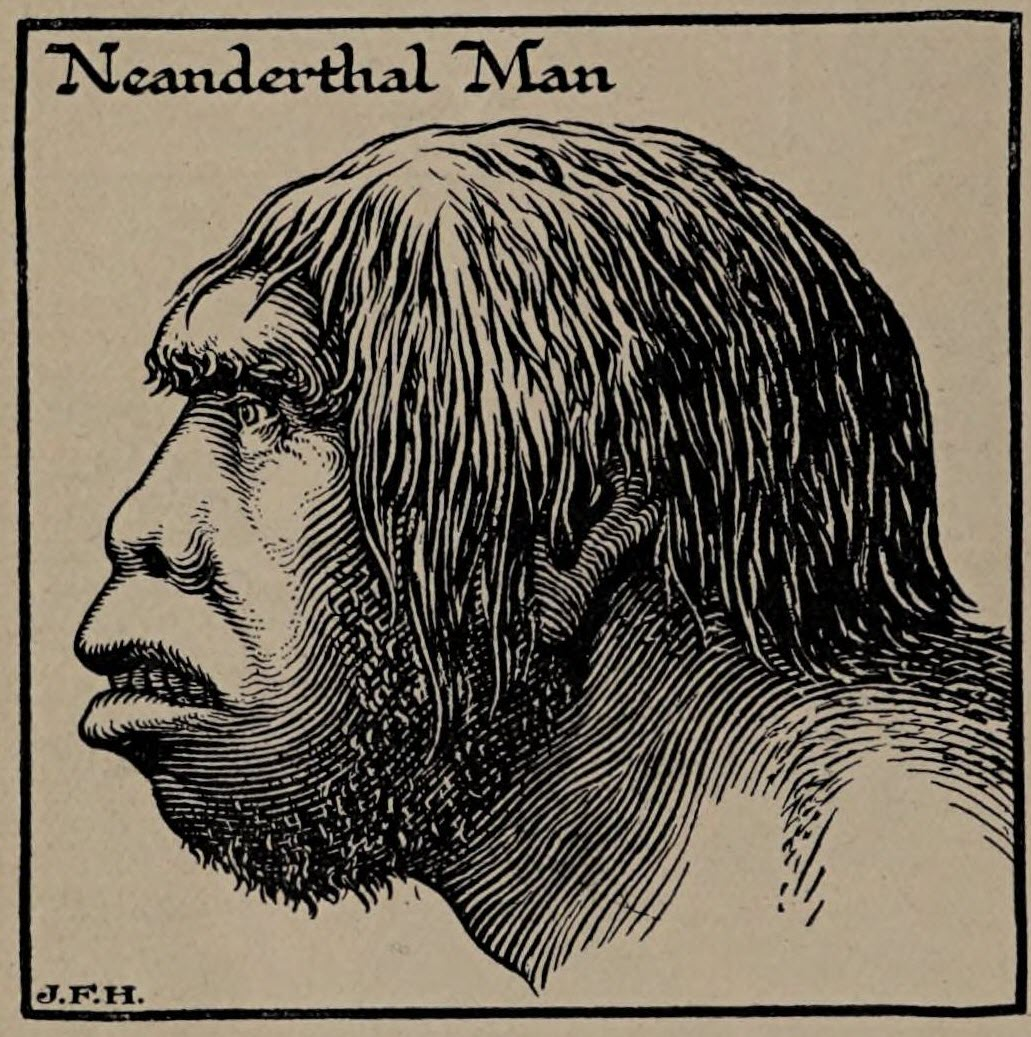
Illustration of a Neanderthal man by J. F. Horrabin, 1923.

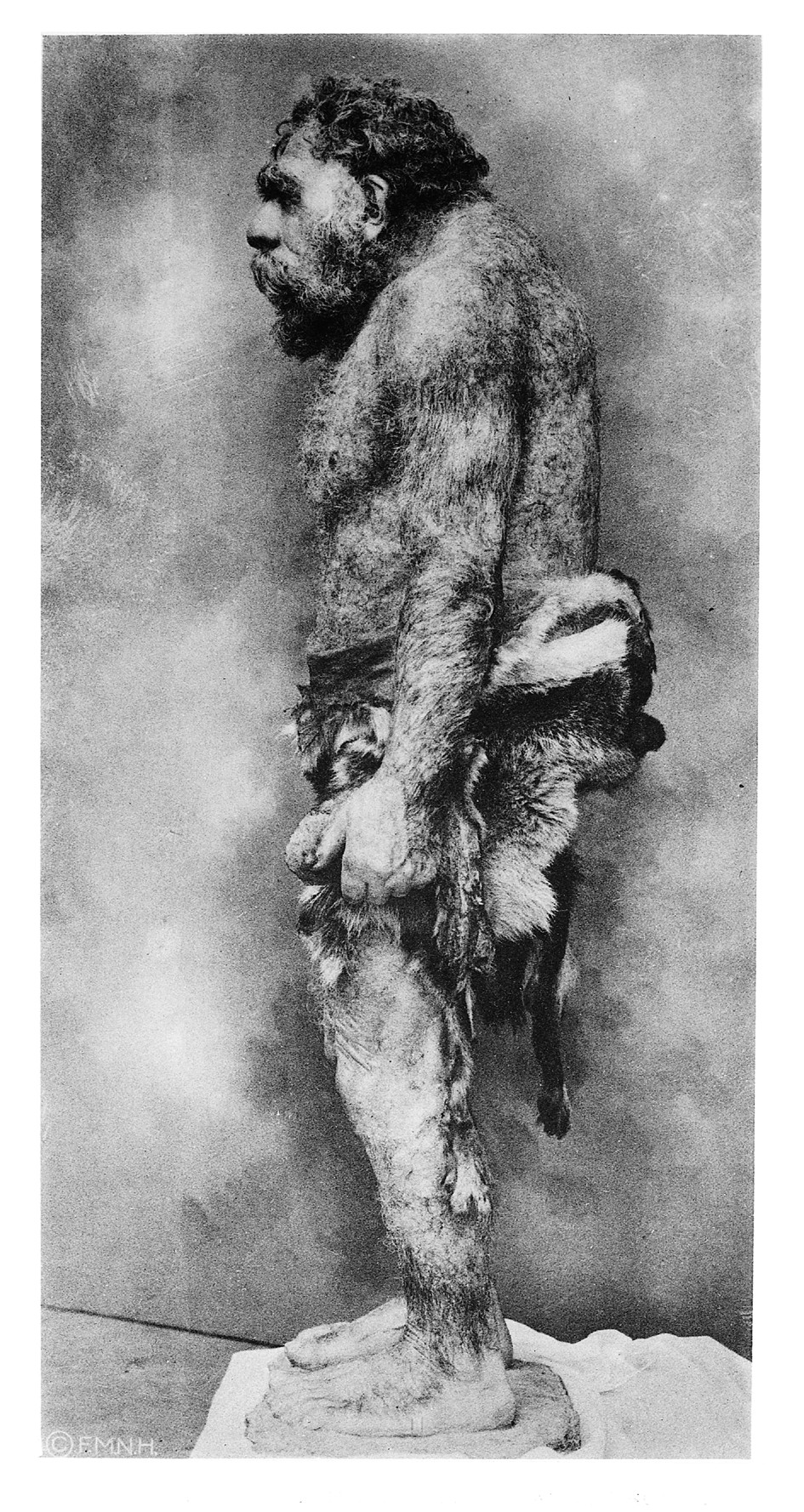
Life restoration of a hairy Neanderthal in an American museum during the 1930's.

The contemporary perception of Neanderthals and their stereotypical portrayal has its origins in 19th century Europe. Naturalists and anthropologists were confronted with an increasing number of fossilized bones that did not match any known taxon. Carl Linnaeus' Systema Naturae of 1758, in which introduced Homo sapiens as a species without diagnosis and description, was the authoritative encyclopedia of the time. The notion of species extinction, which would have contradicted the paradigm of an immutable world and its unchangeable species, all the infallible products of a single and deliberate creator god, was unheard of at that time. Most scholars simply declared the early Neanderthal fossils to be representatives of early "races" of modern man. Thomas Henry Huxley, a future supporter of Darwin's theory of evolution, saw in the Engis 2 fossil a "man of low degree of civilization". He interpreted the discoveries in the Neanderthal Valley as within the range of variation of modern humans.

Rudolf Virchow, who dominated mid-19th century Germany biological sciences, described the bones as a "remarkable individual phenomenon" and as "plausible individual deformation". This statement led to the perception for many years in German-speaking countries that Neanderthal characteristics were merely a form of pathological skeleton change of modern humans to come.

August Franz Josef Karl Mayer, an associate of Virchow, emphasized disease, prolonged pain and struggle on comparison with modern human features. "He confirmed the Neanderthal's rachitic changes in bone development[...]. Mayer argued among other things, that the thigh - and pelvic bones of Neanderthal man were shaped like those of someone who had spent all his life on horseback. The broken right arm of the individual had only healed very badly and the resulting permanent worry lines about the pain were the reason for the distinguished brow ridges. The skeleton was, he speculated, that of a mounted Russian Cossack, who had roamed the region in 1813/14 during the turmoils of the wars of liberation from Napoleon."

Arthur Keith of Britain and Marcellin Boule of France were both senior members of their respective national paleontological institutes and among the most eminent paleoanthropologists of the early 20th century. Both men argued that this "primitive" Neanderthal could not be a direct ancestor of modern man. As a result, the museum's copy of the almost complete Neanderthal fossil of La Chapelle-aux-Saints was inaccurately mounted in an exaggerated crooked pose with a deformed and heavily curved spine and legs buckled. Boule commissioned the first illustrations of Neanderthal where he was characterized as a hairy gorilla-like figure with opposable toes, based on a skeleton that was already distorted with arthritis.

== Portrayals in text ==
=== Screenplays and short stories ===
Title	Year Written/Pub	Author	Anthology	Notes
"The Grisley Folk"	1921	H. G. Wells	The Complete Short Stories	
"The Gnarly Man"	1939	L. Sprague de Camp	Unknown Worlds: Tales from Beyond	A Neanderthal finds himself in a peculiar time-traveling colony mixing people from various time periods and locations. He plays a crucial role in forging an alliance of people from different backgrounds to fight the story's villains - bandit adventurers from Medieval Norman Sicily aided by 20th-century Nazis. Eventually he is able to return to his own era, but finds Neanderthal society too boring and so settles on a career of time-traveling adventure with the Russian woman he loves.
"The Long Remembering"	1957	Poul Anderson	Trips in Time	A modern man undertakes a "mental time travel" enabling him to experience the life of a very remote ancestor, a Cro-Magnon hunter setting out to rescue his mate who was kidnapped by the "Goblins" (Neanderthals) living across the river.
"The Ugly Little Boy"	1958	Isaac Asimov	The Time Travelers: A Science Fiction Quartet	A Neanderthal child is brought into the present via time travel. Neanderthals are sympathetically depicted as having an articulate and sophisticated society and language, in conscious rebuttal of the above stereotype.
"The Ogre"	1959	Avram Davidson	Worlds of IF	A 20th-century archaeologist, who discovered the traces of Neanderthals who survived into historical times and came to a tragic end in a remote valley of 16th-century Germany, came to an equally tragic end himself.
"Wolves Beyond the Border"	1939	Robert E. Howard		
"Heal Thyself"	2008	Orson Scott Card		Neanderthals are accidentally resurrected during testing of an immune system enhancement.

=== Novels ===
Title	Year Written/Pub	Author	Notes
Dian of the Lost Land	1935	Edison Marshall	Neanderthals and Cro-Magnons are traditional enemies surviving in a warm valley of Antarctica
The Man Whose Teeth Were All Exactly Alike	1960/1984	Philip K. Dick	The discovery of a Neanderthal skull in the United States is a plot device.
The Bull from the Sea	1962	Mary Renault	Kentaurs are portrayed as Neanderthals.
The Simulacra	1964/1977	Philip K. Dick	Neanderthals living in primitive towns in the rural areas of the former United States are happy at the outbreak of nuclear war, hoping that self-destruction of Homo sapiens might give them another opportunity to dominate Earth.
The Goblin Reservation	1968	Clifford D. Simak	Twenty years after a Neanderthal named Alley Oop (after the eponymous comic strip) is brought into the present for study purposes he is educated enough to be working on a doctoral thesis but still has trouble with certain social aspects, possessing, for example, a habit of breaking into closed stores when hungry and paying compensation later.
Eaters of the Dead	1976	Michael Crichton	A small Neanderthal population in Northern Europe is the source of the battles recorded in Beowulf. This story was also the basis for a motion picture The 13th Warrior (1999), though the word "Neanderthals" was never mentioned in the movie.
Dance of the Tiger	1981	Björn Kurtén	This book follows interactions between European Homo sapiens and Neanderthals, possible worldviews and origins for troll mythology
Glory Lane	1987	Alan Dean Foster	Spacefaring Neanderthals removed from Earth by powerful aliens return to save them from extinction.
Unsolved Mysteries Past and Present	1993	Colin Wilson	This book discusses evidence and theories of Neanderthal survival into the modern age, including the possibility of their recent breeding with humans, in his book Unsolved Mysteries.
Hunting the Ghost Dancer	1992	Attanasio	Early humans clash with the last of the neanderthals.
Down in the Bottomlands	1988	Harry Turtledove/L. Sprague de Camp	In an alternate timeline the Mediterranean Sea has stayed dry since the Miocene and Europe is still inhabited by Homo neanderthalensis, referred to in the story as "Strongbrows" and described as "shorter, stockier, fairer", than the "Highhead" people (presumably analogous to Homo sapiens).
Neanderthal	1996	John Darnton	A group of surviving Neanderthals discovered in the mountains of Afghanistan is said to possess the ability to read minds due to their larger cranial capacity, but unlike Cro-Magnons, lack the capability of deception on more than two levels at a time. The author blamed the near-extinction of the Neanderthals on this shortcoming.
Circles of Stone	1997	Joan Dahr Lambert	A band of early Homo sapiens team up with a remnant band of Neanderthals to defeat a hostile band of H.sapiens who are trying to take over their territory. Set in the Pyrenees, Neanderthals are dying out because they cannot give birth to enough children; their infant's heads are often too big.
The Silk Code	1999	Paul Levinson	Neanderthals are still living in Basque country in 750 AD, and a few survive in the present world.
Raising Abel	2002	W. Michael Gear and Kathleen O'Neal Gear	Neanderthals, cloned back into existence in modern times, are the targets of assassination attempts by a Christian fundamentalist creationist sect.
Darwin's Radio	2003	Greg Bear	A phenomenon which caused the Neanderthals to die off now threatens modern humans.
Manifold: Origin	2002	Stephen Baxter	This novel prominently features Neanderthals from an alternate timeline. This is a sequel to Manifold: Space where Neanderthal characters also appear, in a narrower context, as genetically engineered slave laborers.
Heaven	2004	Ian Stewart, Jack Cohen	This book features spacefaring Neanderthals who were removed from Earth by powerful aliens for unspecified reasons.
The Sky People	2006	S. M. Stirling	Neanderthals inhabit an alternate-history Venus.
N-words	2013	Ted Kosmatka	Neanderthals are resurrected by South Korean scientists en masse and intermarry with humans.
The Bone Labyrinth	2015	James Rollins	The Watchers are a superior hybrid species of early humans and Neanderthals who disseminated knowledge and possibly interbred with people throughout the world. They also created the protected, hidden city of Atlantis, located in Ecuador.
The Last Neanderthal	2017	Claire Cameron	
L'homme de Grand Soleil	2018	Jacques Gaubil	A novel about the discovery of a Neanderthal living in the frigid northern Quebec and the chain of events that ensues, effectively a portrait of modern humans

=== Novel series ===
Series	Author	Notes
Riverworld	Philip José Farmer	A prominent Neanderthal character named Kazz (short from Kazzintuitruaabemss), who interacts with modern humans.
Earth's Children	Jean M. Auel	Neanderthals appear as characters including in the 1986 movie adaptation of the first book, The Clan of the Cave Bear
Quest for Tomorrow	William Shatner	Neanderthals were a primitive psychic species which caught the eye of a large alien empire, which decided to isolate the telepathic gene and transplanted several experimental subjects to another world. The original Neanderthals were then eliminated so that no one else could reproduce the experiment. The Homo sapiens were not modified. The transplanted Neanderthals eventually evolved into an industrial society; this took much longer than it did for humanity, as a telepathic species would have problems inventing complex technology without the use of writing, which would be an unnecessary tool for telepaths. In the story, Neanderthals eventually joined and transcended their physical shape, becoming a god-like being.
Thursday Next	Jasper Fforde	Neanderthals are brought back from extinction by cloning to act as medical test subjects thanks to their close relation to Homo sapiens but lack of legal status as human beings.
Neanderthal Parallax	Robert J. Sawyer	On an alternate world Neanderthals became the dominant species while Homo sapiens died out.

=== Comics and manga ===
Genre	Year	Publisher	Notes
Comic	1968	DC Comics	Anthro is the first Cro-Magnon boy, born in the Stone Age to Neanderthal parents. His father, Neanderthal caveman Ne-Ahn is the chief of his tribe, his mother a captive member of another tribe.
Comic	1971	DC Comics	In pre-Crisis on Infinite Earths continuity, Gnarrk is a time-displaced Neanderthal stranded in the present. In post-Crisis continuity, Gnarrk is a Cro-Magnon.
Comic	1982	Dark Horse Comics	A main character in Alfredo Castelli's comic book Martin Mystère is a Neanderthal called Java. Martin Mystère found him in Mongolia, home to the last population of Neanderthals. He is named after the Java Man, which are actually much earlier Homo erectus remains.
Comic	2000	Top Cow	Top Cow, an imprint of Image Comics, publishes Kin, a six-issue series about extant Neanderthals.
Comic	2005	DC Comics	In Seven Soldiers of Victory, the New Gods (Metron, Lightray and Orion) came to Earth and adapted the pre-Neanderthal hominids, giving them "fire, inspiration and magic" and creating a semi-immortal king named Aurakles. The resulting Neanderthals then create a scientific civilization which covers the world, until it is destroyed by future time-travellers. They then revert to cave-dwelling and evolve into modern humans.
Manga	2016	Studio Gokumi	In Seton Academy: Join the Pack! the character Anne Anetani initially pretends to be a modern human, but is eventually revealed to be a Neanderthal.

== Film and television ==
Title	Director	Format	Info
The Neanderthal Man	E. A. Dupont	1953 film	Professor Groves turns himself into a Neanderthal man.
Looney Tunes: Mad as a Mars Hare	Chuck Jones	1963 cartoon episode	Bugs Bunny is turned into a "Neanderthal Rabbit" after getting hit by a ray from a time-projector gun by Marvin the Martian.
Korg: 70,000 BC	Irving J. Moore and Christian Nyby	1984–1985 TV series	Features a family of Neanderthals during the Ice Age.
Caveman	Carl Gottlieb	1981 film	Ringo Starr plays a Neanderthal-like caveman in the year "one zillion BC." He and the other characters speak in a "caveman language" and encounter dinosaurs, invent cooking, and learn to walk upright.
Quest for Fire	Jean-Jacques Annaud	1981 film	Features Neanderthals and a Cro-Magnon attempting to carry a vessel containing fire to the Neanderthal's tribe.
Iceman	Fred Schepisi	1984 film	From a screenplay written by John Drimmer, depicts a frozen Neanderthal coming to life again in the 1980s at an arctic research station.
Clan of the Cave Bear	Michael Chapman	1986 film	Novel by Jean M. Auel about prehistoric times. It is the first book in the Earth's Children book series
Ghost Light	Alan Wareing	TV series	A 1989 three-part serial in the television series Doctor Who, a Neanderthal called "Nimrod" (Carl Forgione) is the butler of a Victorian era household.
Cro		TV series	Short-lived animated series centered around a Cro-Magnon child being adopted by a tribe of Neanderthals.
Night at the Museum	Shawn Levy	2006 film	Four Neanderthals were put on display in the American Museum of Natural History. An ancient Egyptian tablet, the Tablet of Akhemrah, causes everything on display in the museum to come to life at night. The Neanderthals showed an interest in fire after it was shown to them by the night guard, Larry Daley.
The Real Adventures of Jonny Quest	Sherry Gunther	TV series	The mythical yetis are stated to be a relict population of Neanderthals.
Dinosaurs	Brian Henson	TV series	Generic "cavemen" have appeared in multiple episodes notably season 3 episodes, "The Discovery," and "Charlene and Her Amazing Humans."
You Can't Do That on Television	Geoffrey Darby	TV program	A Neanderthal-like family was a frequent recurring sketch in the children's show, In keeping with the theme of that particular episode, the sketch often parodied modern issues with coarse, overbearing parents outside of a pre-historic cave setting.
GEICO Cavemen	Joe Lawson	Advertisement	Trademarked characters in a series of television advertisements for the auto insurance company GEICO that have aired from 2004 to present, featuring Neanderthal-like cavemen in a modern setting
The Croods	Chris Sanders; Kirk DeMicco	2013 animated film	Features the titular family as they embark on a journey to find a new home along with a Cro-Magnon boy who has mastered fire and other "technologies" they had never previously encountered.
Walking with Beasts	Tim Haines	Documentary	One is charged by a woolly rhinoceros, but escapes, in part because of his stocky constitution. The climax of the episode is when the clan of Neanderthals attack the herd of mammoth as they turn back to the north.
Ao: The Last Hunter; Ao, le dernier Néandertal	Jacques Malaterre	Prehistoric film	Ao is the protagonist in a 2010 French prehistoric film
Minions	Pierre Coffin; Kyle Balda	2015 animated film	A Neanderthal is one of the Minions' bosses.
The Armstrong & Miller Show	BBC	Comedy sketch show	Various sketches featuring Neanderthals dealing with modern-day situations such as marriage, dating, baby naming and job interviews. In one sketch they discover wine. They are also frequently trying to hunt mammoth, this despite the location being forest and thus unsuitable for such creatures.
William	Tim Disney	2019 film	In 2019, a Neanderthal is cloned using somatic cell nuclear transfer by two scientists. Various stages of his life are portrayed through age 18. His cognitive abilities and differences are studied and many conflicts arise due to his differences with homo sapiens society.
Primal	Genndy Tartakovsky	2019 Adult Swim TV series	The main character, who is a Neanderthal caveman that goes by the name of Spear, tragically begins his story when his mate and two children are attacked and devoured by a pack of Tyrannosauroids that also evoked the traits of Alioramus and Ceratosaurus. Although he overcomes his initial urge to commit suicide, Spear is still learning to cope with the loss. Eventually, he develops a deep bond with Fang, a female Tyrannosaurus who lost her babies by the same pack, and is willing to make any personal sacrifice to protect her
Out of Darkness	Andrew Cumming	2022 Film	The movie takes place in the Paleolithic era following a group of humans that split from their tribe to survive on an unknown shore. They are stalked and ambushed by creatures at night; the 'creatures' are later revealed to be a pair of empathic Neanderthals reacting to their arrival.

== Video games ==
Title	Year	Publisher	Notes
OgOg Alive	2002	Australian Broadcasting Corporation	A browser game in which players take on the role of either a male or female Neanderthal (both named Og Og).
Titan Quest	2006	THQ Nordic	Neanderthals appear as enemies in an Ancient World where mythology and legends are real. In contrast to their real-world extinction, the Neanderthals of Titan Quest continue to thrive in central Asia where they attack and plunder caravans along the Silk Road.
Far Cry: Primal	2016	Ubisoft	Neanderthals are among the game's primary factions. The game is set in an isolated valley around 10,000 BC during the end of the Epipalaeolithic and beginning of the Mesolithic period in Europe. The game's Neanderthals are a remnant group that has survived long after other Neanderthals have gone extinct, though they too are afflicted by a disease and slowly dying out.

== Tapletop games ==
In the Frostburn supplement for the 3.5 edition of Dungeons & Dragons, Neanderthals are among the playable character races.

== Music ==
- Neanderthal Man, a 1970 single by Hotlegs, the precursor band to 10cc

== Politics ==
President Joe Biden condemned Texas Governor Greg Abbott (R) and Mississippi Governor Tate Reeves (R) for "Neanderthal thinking" in ignoring health considerations in dropping mask mandates and removing other restrictions during the COVID-19 pandemic in the United States in March 2021.

== See also ==
- Caveman
- Prehistoric fiction
- Dawn of Humanity (2015 PBS film)
