= UC Davis College of Engineering =

Coordinates: 38.5369°N 121.7547°W

University of California, Davis, College of Engineering
- Type: Public
- Established: 1962
- Dean: Richard L. Corsi
- Faculty: 200
- Undergraduates: 4,403
- Postgraduates: 1,159
- Location: Davis, California, U.S.
- Website: engineering.ucdavis.edu

The UC Davis College of Engineering is one of four colleges on the campus of the University of California, Davis.

== Departments ==
The college is organized into eight departments, which offer various programs of study:

- Biological and Agricultural Engineering
- Biomedical Engineering
- Chemical Engineering
- Civil and Environmental Engineering
- Computer Science
- Electrical and Computer Engineering
- Materials Science and Engineering
- Mechanical and Aerospace Engineering

== Notable alumni ==
Notable alumni of the College of Engineering include:

- David Abe, head of the Electromagnetics Technology Branch at the U.S. Naval Research Laboratory
- Giovonnae Anderson, one of the first African-American women to earn a PhD in electrical engineering
- William L. Ballhaus, CEO of Blackboard, Inc
- Clare Bell, British author in the United States best known for her Ratha series
- Diane Bryant, executive vice president of Intel
- Kyle Bryant, athlete, speaker
- Anthony Cannella, California State Senator
- Constance J. Chang-Hasnain, professor at UC Berkeley
- Alfred Chuang, former CEO and president of BEA Systems, founder and current CEO of Magnet Systems
- Chow Chung-kong, chairman of Hong Kong Exchanges and Clearing
- Ahmed Darwish, Egyptian politician
- Daniel Ha, founder of Disqus
- David Kappos, Under Secretary of Commerce for Intellectual Property and Director of the United States Patent and Trademark Office (USPTO) from 2009 to 2013
- Julie A. MacDonald, deputy assistant secretary for Fish and Wildlife and Parks at the United States Department of the Interior
- Kaveh Madani, Iranian civil and environmental engineer
- Mark Matsumoto, dean of engineering at UC Merced
- Sig Mejdal, sabermetrics analyst, former NASA engineer
- Richard Miller, president of Olin College
- Scott Miller, leader of 1980's band Game Theory
- Jani Macari Pallis, CEO of Cislunar Aerodynamics, professor at University of Bridgeport
- David Phillips, entrepreneur
- Steve Robinson, NASA astronaut
- Indira Samarasekera, President of the University of Alberta
- Carl Sassenrath, computer scientist
- Stratton Sclavos, chairman of the board, president and chief executive officer of VeriSign
- Bernard Soriano, Chief Information Officer (CIO) for the California Department of Motor Vehicles
- Jeffrey Steefel, video game developer
- Adam Steltzner, NASA JPL Lead Engineer
- Howard A. Stone, professor at Princeton University
- Seth Weil, Olympic rower.
- Alvin S. White, test pilot, mechanical engineer

== See also ==
- Department of Applied Science, UC Davis
