= Elaine Anderson =

American paleontologist (1936–2002)

- Born: January 8, 1936; Salida, Colorado
- Died: March 26, 2002 (aged 66); Denver, Colorado
- Education: University of Colorado Boulder
- Scientific career
- Fields: Vertebrate paleontology, Mammalogy, Zooarchaeology, Conservation biology
- Workplaces: Smithsonian Institution, Idaho Museum of Natural History, Colorado State University, Denver Museum of Nature & Science
- Doctoral advisor: Björn Kurtén

Elaine Anderson (January 8, 1936 – March 26, 2002) was an American paleontologist. She is best known for her work on vertebrate paleontology.

== Biography ==
Elaine Anderson was born in Salida, Colorado, on January 8, 1936. She was the only child of John and Edith Anderson. She was raised in Denver, Colorado.

Anderson graduated from the University of Colorado Boulder in 1960. She completed her Master's thesis in 1965. For her Ph.D., she opted to go to Finland, becoming the first Fulbright Scholar to do so. She studied under the Finnish paleontologist Björn Kurtén, then one of the most distinguished authorities on studies on prehistoric mammals. Anderson returned to the United States after completing her Ph.D. and worked as a scientific consultant at the Pleistocene Hall at the Smithsonian Museum of Natural History, Smithsonian Institution. She also worked briefly at the Idaho Museum of Natural History (then known as the Idaho State University Museum of Natural History) and the Maryland Academy of Sciences. She had to leave her latter job in order to return to Denver and care for her ailing mother.

After her mother's death, she stayed in her childhood home, often being visited by other paleontologists, mammalogists and naturalists who were passing through. A frequent visitor of the Denver Museum of Nature & Science (formerly known as the Denver Museum of Natural History), she formally became a member of the staff in 1984. She was elected a Research Associate in 1994. She was also an adjunct professor of Biology at the Colorado State University.

Anderson died on March 26, 2002, in Denver.

== Contributions to science ==
Anderson specialized in vertebrate paleontology and mammals. Her particular interest in the members of Carnivora earned her the affectionate nickname of "The Carnivore Lady". She was an Associate Editor of the journal Mammalian Species, published by the American Society of Mammalogists, from 1995 until her death. She was also involved in the field of zooarcheology, long before the term was even coined. She was also active in the conservation efforts on North American mammalian fauna.

She was a member of the American Quaternary Association and was elected an Honorary Member of the Society of Vertebrate Paleontology in 2000.

She is best known for her work Pleistocene Mammals of North America, written in collaboration with Björn Kurtén in 1980.

== See also ==
- Prehistoric mammal
- Ice age
