= Owl Cave =

Archaeological site in Idaho

Owl Cave is an archaeological site located in southeastern Idaho and was identified in 1978. This site dates all the way back to 9,500 - 8,500 B.P., and is one out of three caves that resulted from a collapsing lava tube on the eastern Snake River Plain. The other two caves within the same area of Owl Cave are Coyote Cave and Dry Cat Cave. Owl Cave is the only cave that has been prominently excavated. A rich history of past environmental life can be traced back to this site's perimeters, where bison hunting and mammoth activity took place.

== Hunting activity ==
=== Bison hunting ===
Contained within the history of the past, bisons played a substantial role in Idaho and continue to do so. Owl Cave has revealed a time when this species' population was at risk. Archeologists have retrieved tons of bison remains in this area using bone beds. Their findings have alluded to evidence of their habitat along the Snake River Plain. However, through further examination of the bone bed, signs of mass killings were found as a result. It was included that, "Traditional methods of communal bison hunting included three primary techniques: (1) impounding bison in pounds, (2) driving bison to trap or jump locations, and (3) surrounding bison in a surround". Research of bison's existence within this area has found that their populations were not only significant in these plains over 4,000 years ago, but they were also being hunted and harvested for the use of Native American survival which therefore led to the decline of their population in this area.

The existence of Owl Cave and surrounding caves further helps researchers trace and understand the emergence of Idaho's significance. However, further attempted examination reveals that so much more encapsulates this site and has yet to be discovered. Through further research, it has been made clear that this cave/location has not been excavated in its entirety, and Owl Cave "has gained some physical protection from landowner stewardship, the Idaho Heritage Trust, and the Archaeological Conservancy".

=== Mammoth hunting ===
According to Researchers, "Owl Cave may be one of the most important terminal Pleistocene archaeological sites in western North America and its research potential has yet to be realized" (Suzann Henrickson, 2017). Before bison were introduced as this location's star animal, Owl Cave revealed speculative evidence relating to the primitive age of mammoth hunting. An archeologist's excavation led to the discovery of an array of mammoth remains at Owl Cave. However, it has been suggested that these findings could be unrelated to this particular site of interest.

Researcher London Karr highlighted and described specific details regarding the remains of a singular Mammoth found at this cite. He revealed, "Only a small fraction of the total bone material from a mammoth is represented, and no element remains complete. The recovered assemblage consists of about 54 long bone fragments, 13 rib sections and fragments, and a variety of fragments of scapulae, vertebrae, teeth, and cancellous bone" (Karr, 2015). This researcher also emphasized the issue of accurate dating within the findings at Owl Cave.

== Closing ==
Owl Cave can be used to help trace and further understand the way of life in the Early Archaic and Paleoindian hunting periods. However, at one point, there was not much accessible data regarding this unique site. When using databases across time, transferring information was not always the most accurate regarding this Cave and many other related sites (Lohse, Anderson, 2002).

== See also ==
- Idaho Museum of Natural History
