= Sarabande (disambiguation) =

A sarabande is a type of dance music in triple meter.

Sarabande and Sarabandes may also refer to:

- Sarabande (album), by Jon Lord
- Sarabande (collection), a fashion collection by Alexander McQueen
- Sarabande Books, an American publisher
- Sarabandes (Satie), set of solo piano pieces written by Erik Satie
- "Sarabande", a movement of Keyboard suite in D minor (HWV 437) composed by George Frideric Handel
- Varèse Sarabande, an American record label
- William Sarabande, American author

== See also ==
- Sarabanda, an Italian television show 1997-2017
