= Allen Andrews (author) =

British author

- Born: 25 April 1913; Greenwich, London, England
- Died: September 1985 (aged 72); London, England
- Occupation: Author
- Writing career
- Period: 1959–1982
- Genres: History, fantasy

Allen Andrews (25 April 1913 – September 1985) was a British author. He was educated at Bancroft School and St John's College, Oxford, and served with the Royal Air Force during the Second World War. He worked as a writer at several newspapers before starting a freelance career in 1957. He became a historian who is the author of a number of fine British histories, biographies, and company histories as well. Many of his books have been translated into foreign languages.

== Publications ==
- Proud Fortress: The Fighting Story of Gibraltar (1959)
- Earthquake (1963)
- The Mad Motorists: The Great Peking-Paris Race of '07 (1964)
- Relax and sleep well (1965)
- Those Magnificent Men in Their Flying Machines (1965)
- The Splendid Pauper (1968)
- Prosecutor: The Life of M. P. Pugh, Prosecuting Solicitor and Agent for the Director of Public Prosecutions (1968)
- Quotations for Speakers and Writers (1969)
- Monte Carlo or Bust: Those Daring Young Men in Their Flying Jalopies (1969)
- The Royal Whore: Barbara Villiers, Countess of Castlemaine (1970)
- The Air Marshals (1970)
- Intensive inquiries: Seven Chief Constables open CID files on their most Remarkable Murder Investigations (1973)
- The Follies of King Edward VII (1975)
- Kings and Queens of England and Scotland (1976)
- The King who lost America (1976)
- The Whiskey Barons (1977)
- The Life of L. S. Lowry (1977)
- Wonders of Victorian Engineering (1978)
- Exemplary Justice (1978)
- The Pig Plantagenet (1980)
- Castle Crespin (1982)

== Adaptations ==
- CBS Storybreak episode "The Pig Plantagenet" (1985)
- Those Magnificent Men in Their Flying Machines Film (1965)
- Monte Carlo or Bust!, released in the United States as Those Daring Young Men in Their Jaunty Jalopies Film (1969)
