= Jeremy Thatcher, Dragon Hatcher =

1991 book by Bruce Coville

- Cover of unknown later edition
- Author: Bruce Coville
- Illustrator: Gary A. Lippincott
- Cover artist: Lippincott
- Series: Magic Shop
- Genre: Fantasy children's novel
- Publisher: 1991 Harcourt Brace Jovanovich; 1991 Hodder (UK); 1992 Aladdin; 2007 Harcourt
- Publication place: United States
- Media type: Print (hardcover)
- Pages: 148
- ISBN: 0152007482
- OCLC: 780935437
- LC Class: PZ7.C8344 Je 1991
- Preceded by: The Monster's Ring
- Followed by: Jennifer Murdley's Toad

Jeremy Thatcher, Dragon Hatcher is a novel by Bruce Coville and is part of the Magic Shop Books. It was published in 1991 by the Harcourt Brace Jovanovich imprint Jane Yolen Books. It was issued in paperback by Aladdin Books and reissued by Harcourt in 2007.

== Plot ==
Jeremy Thatcher knows a thing or two about raising animals—after all, his dad is a veterinarian. But after he leaves Mr. Elive's magic shop with a strange marbled egg, it soon becomes clear that this is one pet he wasn't prepared for. How is he supposed to keep a flame-breathing dragon with razor-sharp teeth and an out-of-control appetite in his bedroom? If the playful baby dragon is ever to grow up to become a magnificent beast of myth and legend, it needs Jeremy and though he doesn't know it yet, Jeremy needs a dragon with a strong connection.

== Reception ==
Jeremy Thatcher, Dragon Hatcher received positive reviews. Kirkus Reviews wrote that it was "a funny, enjoyable, imaginative story whose serious undercurrents lend it unexpected depth." According to Christopher Paolini, Jeremy Thatcher, Dragon Hatcher served as inspiration for his book Eragon.

== Awards ==
The Utah's children book award in 1994. "Always grab the reader by the throat in the first line," says Bruce Coville, author of "Jeremy Thatcher: Dragon Hatcher," winner of the 1994 Utah Children's Book Award. In 1992 Mythopoeic Award Nominated Coville's Jeremy Thatcher Dragon Hatcher for Best Children's Fantasy Literature.

== Challenges ==
In Iowa, parents challenged Coville's novel because it "contained reference to witchcraft and devil worship." Eventually it was proven that there was no references to the devil or witchcraft but the parents thought the mention of silver, red, and black and the symbols of the moon and the stars were all connected to witchcraft and devil worship. The book remained on the shelves.
