= Ivory and Bone =

2016 novel by Julie Eshbaugh

- First edition
- Author: Julie Eshbaugh
- Language: English
- Series: Ivory and Bone
- Genre: Prehistoric fiction
- Publisher: HarperTeen
- Publication date: June 2016
- Publication place: United States
- Media type: Print (hardback and paperback)
- Pages: 371
- ISBN: 006239925X

Ivory and Bone is a prehistoric fiction novel by Julie Eshbaugh, published by HarperTeen in June 2016. It is geared towards young adults, and is an Ice Age "allusion to Pride and Prejudice".

== Reception ==
Kirkus Reviews gave the book a largely positive review, calling it an "involving story solidly told". However, they criticized the way the narration was framed, as it removed any sense of suspense. Publishers Weekly also gave a positive review, describing it as "an exciting and unusual adventure with an emphasis on the power of storytelling".
