= Chocolate Fever =

Book by Robert Kimmel Smith

Chocolate Fever is a juvenile fiction story that was authored by Robert Kimmel Smith. The story was published in 1972.

== Plot summary ==
Young Henry Green loves chocolate so much, he eats it every day and puts it on everything: chocolate mashed potatoes, chocolate-sprinkled noodles, chocolate marshmallows, etc. As it apparently has no adverse effects on Henry's health or well-being, his parents allow it. Then one day at school, Henry does not feel right. During class, he notices that he is breaking out in little brown spots, on his arms. He shows them to his teacher, Mrs. Kimmelfarber who initially dismisses them as freckles. However, the spots suddenly appear on his face as well, and Mrs. Kimmelfarber rushes Henry to Nurse Farthing, the school nurse. She determines that Henry has a strange rash, but cannot determine anything else. Both Mrs. Kimmelfarber and Nurse Farthing smell a mysterious odor of chocolate in the air, which they initially think little of. Suddenly, the small brown spots begin turning into larger brown lumps, similar to chocolate chips, with an audible popping noise. Alarmed, Nurse Farthing takes Henry to the hospital.

At the hospital, Henry is examined by Dr. Fargo, who sends a culture from the lumps to the lab for further analysis. Just as he smells the aroma of chocolate, the lab returns with the news that Henry's lumps are made of "100% pure chocolate". Dr. Fargo announces that Henry is the first person in history to be diagnosed with "chocolate fever", and makes plans to broadcast his discovery to the world. Homesick, frightened and disliking being treated like a science experiment, Henry flees from the hospital. The hospital staff and police pursue Henry for a lengthy chase, but he eventually escapes. Afraid of facing Dr. Fargo again, Henry opts to run away. He later runs into a group of boys from another school who bully him over his appearance. Henry bluffs them by telling them that his chocolate fever is a contagious and deadly disease, and they allow him to escape.

That night, an exhausted Henry attempts to hitchhike beside the highway, where he is picked up by a delivery driver named Mac. Mac convinces Henry that his parents are probably worried about him and offers to drive him back home, but the two are unexpectedly hijacked by two criminals named Lefty and Louie, who believe Mac is hauling a load of valuable furs. They are confused to find that Mac's truck really contains a load of chocolate bars. Now left with two unexpected hostages, the crooks take Mac and Henry back to their hideout and tie them up while they plan what to do next. A group of dogs on the trail of Henry's chocolate aroma burst into the hideout, distracting Lefty and Louie while Mac frees himself and takes their guns. The police arrive and arrest the criminals.

Mac and Henry drive on to the candy company to drop off the cargo of chocolate bars and call Henry's parents. Plant owner Alfred "Sugar" Cane recognizes Henry's illness and explains that the only way to cure chocolate fever is by eating the opposite of chocolate: vanilla. He gives Henry a small box of vanilla pills, and explains that when he was a boy, he too, overindulged in chocolate, and subsequently suffered from chocolate fever. While Mr. Cane still loves chocolate today, he learned to enjoy it in moderation.

Back home, Henry recovers from his chocolate fever and the brown spots vanish. He joins his family at breakfast, where he learns that Mr. Cane, Mac, Nurse Farthing, and Dr. Fargo have all called to check in on him. When his mother offers him chocolate syrup on his pancakes, Henry remembers moderation and decides to go without the syrup, using cinnamon instead. He is so delighted by the taste of cinnamon that he finds himself thinking of all the other foods that might be improved with cinnamon, only to wonder if there might be such a thing as "cinnamon fever".

== Animated adaptation ==
On May 18, 1985, an animated adaptation of Chocolate Fever was shown on the CBS Storybreak TV program. This adaptation was also released on video by Playhouse Video.
