= Zucchini (novel) =

1982 children's novel

- First edition cover
- Author: Barbara Dana
- Illustrator: Eileen Christelow
- Publisher: Harper & Row
- Publication date: 1982
- Media type: Print (Hardcover)
- ISBN: 0-06-021394-9

Zucchini is a 1982 children's novel by Barbara Dana and illustrated by Eileen Christelow. It was followed by a sequel, Zucchini Out West.

== Plot summary ==
The story concerns a young New York boy, Billy, and his pet ferret, Zucchini. The book contains a number of incorrect basic facts about ferrets, such as claiming that they are herbivorous rodents.

== Reception ==
Kirkus Reviews says "Dana tells the story of Zucchini, ... with low-keyed empathy and with an ear for the inflections of colloquial speech ... that keeps you smiling."

== Awards ==
The book won the 1986 Maud Hart Lovelace Award and the 1986–1987 Land of Enchantment Children's Book Award.

== Publishing history ==
ISBN	Publisher	Binding	Published Date
ISBN 0-06-021394-9	Harper & Row	first edition hardcover	1982
ISBN 0-06-021395-7	HarperCollins	hardcover	1982
ISBN 0-553-15285-8	Bantam Books	paperback	1984
ISBN 0-553-15437-0	Yearling	paperback	1984
ISBN 0-440-41402-4	Yearling	paperback reissue	1984
ISBN 0-553-15608-X	Skylark	paperback reissue	1984
ISBN 0-8085-5031-4	Bt Bound	library binding	1999

== Adaptions ==
It was adapted into an episode of CBS Storybreak in 1985.
