= Magic Shop (series) =

Series of novels by Bruce Coville

- The Monster's Ring; Jeremy Thatcher, Dragon Hatcher; Jennifer Murdley's Toad; The Skull of Truth; Juliet Dove, Queen of Love
- Author: Bruce Coville
- Country: United States
- Language: English
- Media type: Print
- No. of books: 5

Magic Shop is a series of children fantasy novels by Bruce Coville. The books revolve around the mysterious magic supplies store run by an old man named S.H. Elives. Each book follows a child who stumbles into the store and acquires a magical being or object of tremendous magical strength and abilities.

The author Christopher Paolini has cited the book Jeremy Thatcher, Dragon Hatcher as an inspiration for his Inheritance Cycle, as he "began to wonder what kind of land a dragon would come from, who would find a dragon egg and who else would be looking for a dragon egg", stating "Trying to answer those three questions has resulted in over 1,000 pages in print".

== Books ==
=== The Monster's Ring (1982) ===
A boy named Russell Crannaker enters Elive's Magic Supplies while running from a bully who is chasing him and is given a magic ring that can turn him into a monster and back to a boy. This was later adapted into an episode of CBS Storybreak.

=== Jeremy Thatcher, Dragon Hatcher (1992) ===
While running from two bullies and a girl who wants to kiss him, Jeremy Thatcher finds the Magic Shop and leaves with a mysterious, magical crystal orb. The orb turns out to be a dragon egg, which hatches into a female dragon that Jeremy develops an unusually strong empathic/telepathic connection with and whom he names Tiamat.

=== Jennifer Murdley's Toad (1993) ===
A plain and unattractive girl named Jennifer Murdley encounters the Magic Shop and is given a wisecracking talking toad, Bufo, who gradually reveals his complicated history and its relation to a growing danger in the present and the secrets about the magical, mystical Jewel of Perfect Happiness in his forehead.

=== The Skull of Truth (1999) ===
Charlie Eggleston, a notorious liar, comes into the Magic Shop and unintentionally steals the Skull of Truth, the wisecracking remnant of the jester Yorick that bears a dark curse, forcing anyone around it to tell the absolute truth.

=== Juliet Dove, Queen of Love (2003) ===
The Greek goddess of strife Eris breaks into the Magic Shop while Mr. Elives is away and gives the shy but acid-tongued Juliet Dove a crystal amulet containing Cupid that causes every boy she meets to become truly, madly and strongly in love with her. With Elives himself unsure of what to do, Juliet is forced to team up with the rats Jerome and Roxanne to prevent Eris from causing worldwide discord and chaos.

=== Short stories ===
Short stories about Elives' Magic Supplies store have appeared in Coville's Oddities anthology books. These stories include:

- Watch Out
- The Metamorphosis of Justin Jones
- The Mask of Eamonn Tiyado

== Characters ==
- Mr. Elives (S.H. Elives) - A mysterious and crotchety old man who runs a magic supplies store. He is implied to be capable of great magic, though his exact origins and capabilities are left unknown.
- Roxanne and Jerome - A pair of talking Immortal Rats. They are introduced at the end of Jennifer Murdley's Toad when a cursed witch spews them from her mouth, and serve as Elives' messengers for much of the rest of the series. Jerome is often shown to be more gruff and easily offended while Roxanne is portrayed as more warm, caring, kindly and motherly.
- Hyacinth Priest - A librarian and storyteller who appears throughout the four-book series. She is implied to be a close friend and associate of Elives, giving the children the necessary information about their purchases and occasionally serving as a more levelheaded offset to Elives' gruffness.
- Russell Crannaker - a boy obsessed with Halloween who is given a magically powerful ring capable of turning him into a vicious monster. The ring creates a monster with one twist and an even more dangerous one with two twists. An incantation and a counterclockwise twist reverts the wearer to human form. Russell remarks why no one has dared attempt a third twist of the ring.
- Jeremy Thatcher - an under-appreciated artistic prodigy who hatches and develops a telepathic/empathic connection with his pet dragon.
- Tiamat - Jeremy's female pet dragon, named for the chaos monster in Babylonian mythology. She has quite a strong psychic connection to Jeremy and is invisible to almost everyone but him. She is largely portrayed as naive and childlike, though she occasionally displays a mischievous streak when her master is in discomfort.
- Mr. Kravitz - Jeremy's art teacher. He is mostly portrayed as hostile toward Jeremy and unappreciative of his artistic skills, though he at one point admits that Jeremy is his most talented student, lacking only proper discipline, and it is suggested that he is actually jealous of Jeremy's talent.
- Charlie Eggleston - a boy who had a habit of lying about everything. He steals the Skull of Truth from the Magic Shop, causing himself and everybody around him to only be able to speak the truth.
- Jennifer Murdley - a plain girl who wishes she was beautiful and who buys a talking toad from the Magic Shop.
- Juliet Dove - an extremely shy girl with a "killer" tongue from Venus Harbor who is given a locket from the Magic Shop that seemingly causes all the boys at her school to fall in love with her.

== Reception ==
Critical reception for the Magic Shop series has been mostly positive. The Reading Teacher, Horn Book Guide, and Booklist all reviewed The Monster's Ring, with The Reading Teacher commenting that it was "hard to believe that a story can be both funny and suspenseful, yet this one is." Publishers Weekly reviewed the audiobook of Jeremy Thatcher, Dragon Hatcher, praising it for its cast of performers. Kliatt would later also praise the audiobook narration of another book in the series, Juliet Dove, Queen of Love. Publishers Weekly later wrote a mixed review for The Skull of Truth, stating "Though the tale itself is lackluster, Coville does keep readers engaged with tight plotting and an otherworldly climax."

Danielle Bienvenue Bray examined the book Jeremy Thatcher, Dragon Hatcher in her 2015 article "Sissy Boy Mothering: Male Child Mother Figures in Middle-Grade Fantasy Literature" in Children's Literature in Education.
