= The Ugly Little Boy =

Short story by Isaac Asimov

- Short story by Isaac Asimov
- Original title: Lastborn
- Country: United States
- Language: English
- Genre: Science fiction

Publication
- Published in: Galaxy Science Fiction
- Publisher: Galaxy Publishing
- Media type: Magazine
- Publication date: September 1958

The Ugly Little Boy (novel)
- Author: Isaac Asimov and Robert Silverberg
- Cover artist: Wayne McLoughlin
- Language: English
- Genre: Science fiction
- Publisher: Doubleday
- Publication date: September 1992
- Publication place: United States
- Media type: Print (hardcover and paperback)
- Pages: 290
- ISBN: 0-385-26343-0
- OCLC: 27187588
- Dewey Decimal: 813/.54 20
- LC Class: PS3551.S5 U45 1992

"The Ugly Little Boy" is a science fiction short story by American writer Isaac Asimov. The story first appeared in the September 1958 issue of Galaxy Science Fiction under the title "Lastborn", and was reprinted under its current title in the 1959 collection Nine Tomorrows. The story deals with a Homo neanderthalensis child which is brought to the future by means of time travel. Robert Silverberg later expanded it into a novel with the same title published in 1992 (also published as Child of Time in the UK).

Asimov has said that this was his second or third favorite (Note: At the end of reading the short story (Science Fiction Favorites) Isaac Asimov says: In the case of this particular story I have received letters from people who say that they cried when they read the last part of the story, and I always answer and say well I'm glad they did because I cried when I wrote it and in fact I cried when I just read it, so I guess it means something to me.) of his own stories.

== Plot summary ==
A Neanderthal child is brought to the present day as a result of time travel experiments by Stasis Inc, a research organization. He cannot be removed from his immediate area because of the vast energy loss and time paradoxes that would result, and is kept in the present by way of a Stasis module. In order to care for the boy the organization hires Edith Fellowes, a children's nurse.

Initially repelled by the boy's appearance, Edith soon begins to regard him as her own child, learning to love him and realizing that he is far more intelligent than she first imagined. She dubs him 'Timmie' and attempts to ensure that he has the best possible childhood despite his circumstance. She is enraged when the newspapers refer to him as an "ape-boy." Edith's love for Timmie brings her into conflict with her employer, for whom he is more of an experimental animal than a human being.

Eventually, her employer comes to the conclusion that his organization has exacted all the knowledge and publicity it can from Timmie and that the time has come to move on to the next project. This involves bringing a medieval peasant into the present, which necessitates the return of Timmie to his own time. Edith fights the decision, knowing the boy cannot survive if returned to his own time due to his acquisition of modern dependencies and speech. She attempts to smuggle the boy out of the facility, but when that plan fails she disrupts the integrity of the Stasis module and returns to the ancient past with Timmie.

== Television adaptation ==
In 1977, "The Ugly Little Boy" was made into a 26-minute telefilm in Canada. The film was directed by and stars Barry Morse. London-born actress Kate Reid played the role of Nurse Fellowes. Guy Big, in his last role, played the boy. The film is noteworthy for its fidelity to the short story, as well as the pathos between Timmy and Nurse Fellowes which garnered praise from both fans and reviewers. The film was named to the ALA Notable Children's Films list in 1977.

== Novelization ==
The 1991 novelization of the same title (published as Child of Time in the UK) expands on the short story by introducing Timmie's original Neanderthal tribe as well as a children's advocacy group that seeks to liberate Timmie. The Neanderthals are shown sympathetically as a highly articulate people whose tribal society and culture is complex and sophisticated, a far cry from the "primitive brutes" which the future scientists consider them to have been, having only the fragmentary information derived from a little Neanderthal child. This Neanderthal society—shown mainly from the point of view of an assertive tribal woman determined to prove herself the equal of the male hunters/warriors—is suddenly faced with the appearance of a completely different, competing kind of human being: the Cro-Magnons. While the Cro-Magnons try to negotiate with the Neanderthals, they cannot communicate and understand each other due to their differing languages. The Neanderthal characters are filled with a sense of foreboding.

The two story lines merge when Edith Fellowes makes the irrevocable decision to go back to the past with Timmie. Her appearance coincides with the crisis point in the confrontation between Neanderthal and Cro-Magnon; both groups regard her as a goddess to be worshiped. As she is clearly akin to the Cro-Magnon but has adopted a Neanderthal child, her appearance deflects the two groups from a would-be inevitable conflict.

The ending suggests that in the modified past Neanderthals and Cro-Magnon would cooperate and come closer to each other in the common worship of the "Goddess" — with Timmie growing up to be her acolyte and a "demigod" himself. It also suggests that the Neanderthals may not become extinct but could coexist with the Cro-Magnon, possibly interbreeding with them, which would change the whole of subsequent human history (or, according to a different theory of the implications of time travel, could have no effect at all due to the "convergent series").

== Critical view ==
Margaret Woods wrote about the novel: "Well, 'Ugly Little Boy' draws you right in and does not let go. An enthralling plot, credible characters which make you feel great empathy — all of which serves to hide a very fundamental flaw: the basic premise of the plot just does not make any sense. What the hell is the use of spending a lot of money and effort in order to bring a Neanderthal child into the here-and-now — and then proceeding to give him an English name, teach him English, and place him in a modern environment with modern toys to play with? How is that supposed to help you learn about the Neanderthals?"

== Original ending ==
In the first draft of the story, the story had ended very differently. Timmie was not returned to his own time, and it transpired that, due to his abduction, he was no longer the inventor of the technique for artificially creating fire, as he would have been. The course of history was therefore set back by 2,500 years, wiping out modern civilization — a clear Butterfly effect. This assumes, however, that a child snatched at complete random from prehistoric times would turn out to be exactly the unique inventor of making fire, and also that with him absent no one else would have invented it — both quite unlikely.

Galaxy editor Horace Gold insisted that Asimov change the ending. Asimov agreed, and once he had written the new ending the story became one of Asimov's own favourites.

== See also ==
- Neanderthals in popular culture
