= The War with Grandpa =

2020 American family-comedy-drama film

- Theatrical release poster
- Directed by: Tim Hill
- Screenplay by: Tom J. Astle; Matt Ember
- Based on: The War with Grandpa by Robert Kimmel Smith
- Produced by: Marvin Peart; Rosa Morris Peart; Phillip Glasser
- Starring: Robert De Niro; Uma Thurman; Rob Riggle; Oakes Fegley; Laura Marano; Cheech Marin; Jane Seymour; Christopher Walken
- Cinematography: Greg Gardiner
- Edited by: Peter S. Elliot; Craig Herring
- Music by: Aaron Zigman
- Production companies: Marro Films; Sigh Films; The Fyzz Facility; West Madison Entertainment; Tri-G Films; EFO; Ingenious Media
- Distributed by: 101 Studios; Brookdale Studios
- Release dates: August 28, 2020 (Lithuania); October 9, 2020 (United States)
- Running time: 94 minutes
- Country: United States
- Language: English
- Budget: $38 million
- Box office: $46.8 million

The War with Grandpa is a 2020 American family comedy film directed by Tim Hill, from a screenplay by Tom J. Astle and Matt Ember, based upon the novel of the same name by Robert Kimmel Smith. The film is about a young boy named Peter (Oakes Fegley) who fights in a prank war with his grandfather (Robert De Niro) to get his grandfather to move out of his room after he moves in with his family. Uma Thurman, Rob Riggle, Laura Marano, Cheech Marin, Jane Seymour, and Christopher Walken also star.

Originally filmed in May 2017, The War with Grandpa's release was delayed several times due to photography changes and the closure of The Weinstein Company, the original distributor. The film was eventually released theatrically in the United States on October 9, 2020, by 101 and Brookdale Studios, as well as abroad beginning in August 2020 by Brookdale Studios. It received generally negative reviews from critics and grossed $46 million worldwide against a production budget of $38 million, making it a box-office bomb.

== Plot ==
After accidentally stealing from a grocery store due to having trouble with the self-checkouts and causing a scene with the store manager, recently widowed Ed Marino is visited by his daughter Sally Marino-Decker who wants him to move in with her family. Ed does not want to leave his house because he built it himself, but Sally, concerned about her father's well-being, convinces Ed to move in with her and gives him her son Peter's bedroom. Peter is not happy about giving his room to his grandfather and being moved to the attic. Ed is welcomed by Sally's husband Arthur and two daughters, Mia and Jenny. During his first day, Ed spends most of his time in his new room, sitting in his chair and looking at the sky while still thinking about his late wife.

Peter then tells his friends Billy, Steve, and Emma about his grandfather moving in with his family and living in his room. After a miserable first night in his new room, Peter decides to declare war. Ed agrees, as long as they follow the rules of engagement: they cannot damage other people's belongings and cannot tell the family about their arrangement. Peter pulls a series of pranks, including replacing Ed's shaving cream with quick-drying foam and damaging his record player. Ed gets back at Peter with pranks including removing all of the screws from Peter's furniture and rewriting his school report. Ed turns to his friends Danny and Jerry for some advice. Over time, Ed begins to spend time with his granddaughters and son-in-law and learns how to use modern technology, such as self-checkouts and apps.

Sally learns that Mia is dating a boy named Russell, whom she does not approve of. Ed invites Jerry, Danny, and a store worker named Diane, who Ed has befriended to play dodgeball against Peter and his friends. Peter and his friends win the first round, but Ed and his team manage to beat them during the second round. However, during the third round, Danny's jaw is injured, and the game is declared a tie. Later, Peter pushes the button on Ed's emergency call necklace and Ed picks Peter up from school to take him fishing. The two discover that it is illegal to fish there. Ed then takes Peter to his old house and explains that he left some secrets in the walls.

Ed learns that Peter is being bullied, so he, Danny, and Jerry throw the bully in a dumpster. At Jenny's Christmas-themed birthday party, Peter keeps his promise about not pulling any pranks. Peter rigs up an ejector seat for Ed, who is supposed to be playing the part of Santa that night. Unfortunately, a last-minute change results in Jerry being dressed up as Santa. Throughout the party, Peter and Ed are asked to help out. Instead, they continue to prank each other, including spraying bottles at each other and Peter plugging the cord to the lights as Ed checks them, shocking Ed. As a result of their hijinks, they inadvertently reveal their war with each other to everyone. Jerry gets ejected from his chair, resulting in further property damage and injuries to multiple guests. During this, Jenny's Christmas tree prop falls onto the house, leaving a hole in Mia's room and revealing Mia's secret tryst with Russell. Afterwards, Ed is injured and taken to the hospital.

As punishment, Arthur and Sally place Peter and Mia under "work arrest" for six months. Russell shows up; Sally initially seems angry at him, but instead welcomes him. Sally goes to pick up Ed from the hospital, but learns that he has already checked out and his Lyft driver Chuck has taken him to his old house. Peter decides to make amends and begs Ed to move back in with the family. The two finally reconcile, as Sally listens.

As time passes, Ed and Peter seem to finally be getting along until Ed leaves one day to be with Diane, with whom he is now in a relationship. Peter looks on angrily, declaring a war on both of them as they leave.

== Cast ==
- Robert De Niro as Ed Marino: Mia, Peter & Jenny's maternal grandfather and Sally's father. In the book, the character is named Jack.
- Uma Thurman as Sally Marino-Decker: Ed's daughter, Mia, Peter & Jenny's mother, and Arthur's wife
- Rob Riggle as Arthur Decker: Mia, Peter & Jenny's father and Sally's husband
- Oakes Fegley as Peter Decker: Ed's grandson, Sally & Arthur's son and Mia & Jenny's brother. In the book, the family surname is Stokes.
- Laura Marano as Mia Decker: Ed's older granddaughter, Arthur & Sally's daughter and Peter & Jenny's older sister
- Christopher Walken as Jerry: one of Ed's two friends
- Cheech Marin as Danny: one of Ed's two friends
- Jane Seymour as Diane: who befriends Ed, Jerry and Danny
- Juliocesar Chavez as Billy: one of Peter's friends
- Isaac Kragten as Steve: one of Peter's friends
- T.J. McGibbon as Emma: one of Peter's friends
- Poppy Gagnon as Jenny Decker: Ed's younger granddaughter, Arthur & Sally's daughter, and Mia & Peter's younger sister
- Lydia Styslinger as Lisa: Steve's older sister
- Colin Ford as Russell: Mia's boyfriend
- Joe Gelchion as Chuck: Ed's Lyft driver who Ed says is his brother to get out of the hospital
- Faizon Love as David: a grocery store manager
- Rutanya Alda as Lynn Marino
- Kendrick Cross as Insurance Adjuster
- Drew Scheid as the 8th Grade Monster

== Production ==
The film was adapted from the novel of the same name, written by Robert Kimmel Smith. In 2013, producer Marvin and Rosa Peart's eight-year-old son Tre brought the book to their attention. After acquiring the rights, principal photography on the film began on May 2, 2017, in Atlanta, Georgia, where it shot for 12 weeks.

== Release ==
The War with Grandpa was initially scheduled to be released by The Weinstein Company through Dimension Films on April 21, 2017, which was later pushed back to October 20, 2017, due to principal photography location changes. In August 2017 the film was again delayed, this time to February 23, 2018.

In January 2018, less than a month before its intended release, the film was pulled from the release schedule. In March 2018, it was announced The Weinstein Company would no longer distribute the film, and its rights were reclaimed by the producers for $2.5 million. In June 2020, 101 and Brookdale Studios acquired distribution rights to the film and set it for a September 18, 2020 release; it was later pushed back to October 9. The studios spent an estimated $24 million promoting the film.

== Reception ==
=== Box office ===
The War with Grandpa grossed $21.3 million in the United States and Canada, and $25.5 million in other territories, for a worldwide total of $46.8 million.

In the US, the film made $1.1 million from 2,250 theaters on its first day of release. It went on to debut to $3.6 million, becoming the first film to top Tenet at the box office. In its second weekend the film grossed $2.5 million, finishing second behind newcomer Honest Thief, and then made $1.9 million in its third weekend and $1.1 million in its fourth week. After six weeks the film stood at $15.5 million domestically, with industry insiders estimating the film could leg out to $20 million. By mid-February 2021, in its 20th week of release, the film was still playing in 653 theaters and grossed $224,000, for a running total of $20.3 million.

=== Critical response ===
On review aggregator Rotten Tomatoes, the film holds an approval rating of 29% based on 120 reviews, with an average rating of 4.4/10. The website's critics consensus reads, "Fitfully funny but mostly misguided, The War with Grandpa will leave audiences with a handful of chuckles—and a lot of questions about what this talented cast was thinking." On Metacritic, it has a weighted average score of 34 out of 100, based on 23 critics, indicating "generally unfavorable reviews". Audiences polled by CinemaScore gave the film an average grade of "B+" on an A+ to F scale.

On RogerEbert.com, Christy Lemire gave the film one out of four stars, calling it "a straining comedy" featuring a "wildly overqualified" cast. Jude Dry of IndieWire gave the film a "D+" and wrote: "...the killer cast is sorely wasted on an utterly inane script about a spoiled kid who inexplicably decides he hates his very nice grandpa for moving into his room. Based on the popular kids' book by Robert Kimmel Smith, The War with Grandpa is a sluggish hodgepodge of slapstick humor that barely holds together its illogically motivated plot."

Peter Travers, reviewing the film for ABC News, wrote: "It's an individual choice whether or not to risk bringing children to theaters to see The War with Grandpa... But if you take the plunge and keep your expectations low, you could do worse than watching De Niro and company shake their sillies out."

== Possible sequel ==
In November 2020, producers Marvin and Rosa Peart announced their intentions for a sequel, titled The World War with Grandpa, which was subtly foreshadowed by the final scene of the movie. As of 2026, there have been no further updates on a proposed sequel.
