= CBS Storybreak =

1985 American children's anthology television series

- CBS Storybreak logo, as seen on the show's opening sequence.
- Presented by: Bob Keeshan (1985–1989); Malcolm-Jamal Warner (1993–1994)
- Theme music composer: Jerry Winn; Mark Mercury; Tom Burton
- Countries of origin: United States; Australia
- Original language: English
- No. of seasons: 3
- No. of episodes: 26

Production
- Executive producer: Paul Bogrow
- Producer: Steve Lumley
- Running time: 30 minutes
- Production companies: Southern Star/Hanna-Barbera Australia; CBS Entertainment Productions

Original release
- Network: CBS
- Release: March 30, 1985 – January 28, 1989

CBS Storybreak is a Saturday morning anthology television series that originally aired on the CBS network from 1985 to 1989. Hosted by Bob Keeshan (and in its 1993 return by Malcolm-Jamal Warner), the episodes are half-hour animated adaptations of children's books published at the time of airing, including Chocolate Fever. Other episodes included Dragon's Blood and Ratha's Creature. The show grew out of a feature on Keeshan's Captain Kangaroo series.

== Background ==
CBS' first in-house cartoon series since their original Terrytoons, it was nominated for an Emmy for Outstanding Animated Program in the 1985–1986 season. It continued in repeats until 1991 and returned to air in reruns (with Jamal-Warner replacing Keeshan as host) from the 1993–94 to 1997–98 seasons. Select episodes were released on home video in 1992 under the title Video Storybreak.

Unique for an American television series, the series featured open captions captioned by the National Captioning Institute for the hearing impaired during its 1993 reairing, instead of the usual closed captioning. In addition to being a convenience for the hearing-impaired, this also allowed those who could hear to read along with the story. The episodes were produced by Australia's Southern Star/Hanna-Barbera Australia for CBS Entertainment Productions. The series featured regular Read More About It project selections from the Library of Congress in Washington, D.C., that were highlighted at the end of show by both Keeshan and Jamal-Warner. Southern Star Productions created and composed the theme song in mid 1984. Synthesizers used in the theme song included the Roland Jupiter 8, PPG Wave, Yamaha DX-7, Korg Poly 61, and the Linndrum.

== Episodes ==
=== Season 1 (1985) ===
No. overall	No. in season	Title	Directed by	Written by	Original release date
1	1	"The Great Ringtail Garbage Caper"	Chris Cuddington & Di Rudder	Mark Evanier	March 30, 1985
2	2	"Yeh-Shen: A Cinderella Story from China"	Ray Patterson	Malcolm Marmorstein	April 6, 1985
3	3	"Robbut: A Tale of Tails"	Chris Cuddington	Cliff Ruby & Elana Lesser	April 13, 1985
4	4	"How to Eat Fried Worms"	Chris Cuddington	Michael Maurer	April 20, 1985
5	5	"Zucchini"	Ray Patterson	Paul Haggis	April 27, 1985
6	6	"Hank the Cowdog"	Chris Cuddington	Sharman DiVono	May 4, 1985
7	7	"The Double Disappearance of Walter Fozbek"	Chris Cuddington	Michael Reaves	May 11, 1985
8	8	"Chocolate Fever"	Don MacKinnon	Robert Kimmel Smith	May 18, 1985
9	9	"Dragon's Blood"	Chris Cuddington	Michael Reaves	May 25, 1985
10	10	"Arnold of the Ducks"	Di Rudder	Mark Evanier	June 1, 1985

=== Season 2 (1985) ===
No. overall	No. in season	Title	Directed by	Written by	Original release date
11	1	"C.L.U.T.Z."	Chris Cuddington	Sharman DiVono	September 14, 1985
12	2	"Witch-Cat"	Chris Cuddington	Cliff Ruby & Elana Lesser	September 21, 1985
13	3	"The Pig Plantagenet"	Chris Cuddington	Mark Evanier	September 28, 1985
14	4	"Harry, the Fat Bear Spy"	Nelson Rhodes	Gordon Kent	October 12, 1985
15	5	"Hugh Pine"	Chris Cuddington	Michael Reaves	October 26, 1985
16	6	"The Roquefort Gang"	Chris Cuddington	Mark Evanier	November 9, 1985

=== Season 3 (1987–1989) ===
No. overall	No. in season	Title	Directed by	Written by	Original release date
17	1	"Mama Don't Allow"	Chris Cuddington & Jon McClenahan	Mark Evanier	September 19, 1987
18	2	"The Shy Stegosaurus of Cricket Creek"	Chris Cuddington & Jon McClenahan	J. Michael Straczynski	September 26, 1987
19	3	"What Happened in Hamelin"	Chris Cuddington	Malcolm Marmorstein	October 3, 1987
20	4	"The Monster's Ring"	Chris Cuddington	Rowby Goren	October 10, 1987
21	5	"Max and Me and the Time Machine"	Chris Cuddington	Rowby Goren	October 17, 1987
22	6	"The Gammage Cup"	Ray Patterson	Gordon Kent	October 24, 1987
23	7	"Jeffrey's Ghost"	Chris Cuddington & Jon McClenahan	Malcolm Marmorstein	September 17, 1988
24	8	"Grinny"	Chris Cuddington	Michael Cassutt	September 24, 1988
25	9	"Raggedy Ann and Andy and the Camel with the Wrinkled Knees"	Don MacKinnon	Linda Woolverton	October 1, 1988
26	10	"Ratha's Creature"	Chris Cuddington	Gordon Kent	January 28, 1989

== International syndication ==
- Network Ten (Australia)
- Channel 5 (Singapore)
- RTÉ (Ireland)
- TVNZ (New Zealand)

== See also ==
- The Pagemaster, a film with a similar premise
- Reading Rainbow
