= Ivory Carver Trilogy =

Books focusing on prehistoric Aleut tribes written by Sue Harrison

- Mother Earth Father Sky; My Sister the Moon; Brother Wind
- Author: Sue Harrison
- Cover artist: Mel Grant
- Country: United States
- Language: English
- Genre: Fiction, young adult
- Publisher: Avon Books
- Published: 1990 - 1994
- Media type: Print, ebook, audiobook
- No. of books: 3

The Ivory Carver Trilogy is a trilogy of novels by American author Sue Harrison which are aimed at younger readers and focus on prehistoric Aleut tribes. The first book, Mother Earth Father Sky, was published in 1990 and was followed up with My Sister the Moon (1992) and Brother Wind (1994).

== Mother Earth Father Sky ==
Mother Earth Father Sky is the first novel in the trilogy. In this novel, Chagak's tribe is attacked by a warlike tribe, including Man-Who-Kills, who rapes her and is subsequently killed, but becomes the father of her child, Samiq, who becomes an important character in the subsequent novels. It was chosen among the Best Books for Young Adults by the American Library Association in 1991 and was a Main Selection of the Literary Guild Book Club.

== Reception ==
Carolyn See in Los Angeles Times wrote a mixed review for Mother Earth Father Sky, stating "the beginning of civilization is still a great story". But she criticized the work for its strongly negative view of men, and for being too overly-detailed with discussion of mundane daily details which interrupt the "rip-roaring action".

== Books ==
- Mother Earth Father Sky (1990) According to WorldCat, the book is held in 2943 libraries Also translated into Spanish as Madre tierra, padre cielom into French as Ma mère la terre, mon père le ciel and into German as Vater Himmel, Mutter Erde
- My Sister the Moon (1992) According to WorldCat, the book is held in 1974 libraries Alsdo translated into Spanish as Mi hermana la luna and into French as Ma soeur la Lune .
- Brother Wind (1994) According to WorldCat, the book is held in 1538 libraries. Also translated into Spanish as Mi hermano el viento.
