= Stanley Waterloo =

American novelist

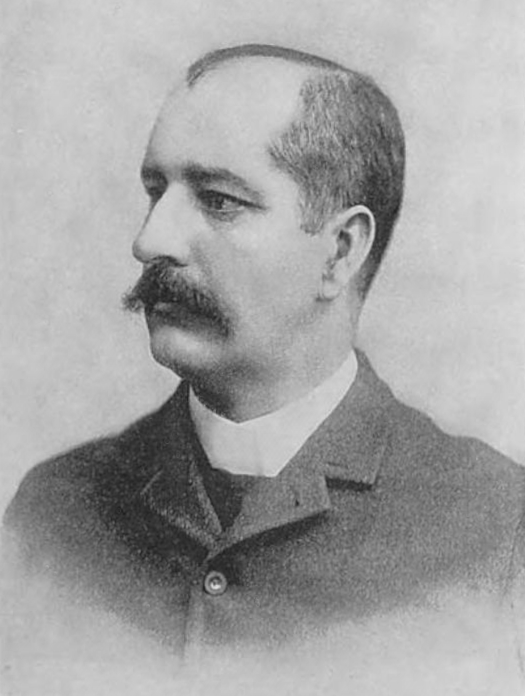
- Waterloo in 1895
- Born: May 21, 1846; Michigan, United States
- Died: October 11, 1913 (aged 67); Chicago, Illinois, United States
- Resting place: Mount Hope Cemetery, Cook County, Illinois
- Education: University of Michigan
- Occupations: Newspaperman, writer
- Notable work: The Story of Ab: A Tale of the Time of the Cave Man
- Spouse: Anna Charlotte Kitton (m. 1874)

Stanley Waterloo (21 May 1846 – 11 October 1913) was an American newspaperman, editor, newspaper owner, and author of both non-fiction and fiction. He was born in St. Clair County, Michigan in 1846 and died in Chicago, Illinois in 1913 (of pneumonia). He married Anna Charlotte Kitton on February 11, 1874. Waterloo attended the University of Michigan. One source says he graduated in 1869, but another says he did not. Waterloo secured an appointment to West Point, but was not able to attend, because he suffered an injury. One account was that he had been kicked by a horse he was trying to break. Having grown up in the countryside, Waterloo was fond of the outdoors and was highly regarded for his descriptions of nature. He was, among other things, a game warden for Illinois.

== Biography ==
By 1870, Waterloo was in Chicago, where he went to study law but dropped out and instead began his career in journalism. In 1871, after the Great Chicago Fire, he moved to St. Louis, Missouri, and acquired a proprietorship interest in the Evening Journal. For the next dozen years he worked in Missouri at, variously, the Missouri Republican, the St. Louis Chronicle, and the St. Louis Globe-Democrat. While Waterloo was editor of the Chronicle, an editorial appeared which was critical of a local judge. The judge threatened Waterloo and there were concerns that the threat included physical violence. Waterloo refused to back down. It turned out that the editorial was actually written by another judge. He then moved to St. Paul, Minnesota, where he began a newspaper named The Day. He then moved back to Chicago and worked in an editorial capacity at the Chicago Tribune. This occupied the next half dozen years, and during this time he was twice president of the Chicago Press Club. He then turned exclusively to literature.

His first novel, A Man and a Woman, sold more than 100,000 copies in six months. His work was well received in England, and he was one of the first American authors to sell well there. His most famous work, The Story of Ab: A Tale of the Time of the Cave Man, was followed by a story by Jack London, "Before Adam", which was so similar to Waterloo's novel that Waterloo accused London of plagiarism. London denied this, explaining that his story was in the nature of a commentary on Waterloo's work.

== Works ==
- How It Looks (1888)
- A Man and a Woman (1892)
- An Odd Situation (1893)
- Honest Money: "Coin's" Fallacies Exposed (1895) with William Hope Harvey
- Famous American Men and Women (1896) with John Wesley Hanson, Jr.
- The Story of Ab: A Tale of the Time of the Cave Man (1897)
- Armageddon: A Tale of Love, War, and Invention (1898)
- The Wolf's Long Howl (1899)
- The Launching of a Man (1899)
- The Seekers (1900)
- These Are My Jewels (1902)
- The Story of a Strange Career: Being the Autobiography of a Convict (1902)
- A Son of the Ages: The Reincarnations and Adventures of Scar, the Link (1914)
