= Björn Kurtén =

Finnish paleontologist (1924–1988)

- Kurtén in 1986
- Born: 19 November 1924; Vaasa, Finland
- Died: 28 December 1988 (aged 64); Helsinki, Finland
- Occupations: Professor; paleontologist; author
- Spouse: Ruth Nordman (m. 1950)
- Children: 4

Academic background
- Education: University of Helsinki

Björn Kurtén (19 November 1924 – 28 December 1988) was a Finnish vertebrate paleontologist and science fiction writer. He was known for his study of prehistoric carnivorans, particularly bears, and he won numerous awards for his popular science writing. He also wrote prehistoric fiction novels combining aspects of science fiction with paleontology.

== Early life and education ==
Kurtén was born in Vaasa in 1924 to Lennart Joachim Kurten and Hjördis Rose Ståhlberg. He was a member of the Swedish-speaking minority in Finland. He graduated from the Vasa Svenska Samskola in 1943, but his education was interrupted by World War II, and he did not resume studies until he finished his military service in 1945.

He took courses in the University of Helsinki studying zoology, chemistry, geology, and paleontology. He went on to study the Hipparion genus in Uppsala, Sweden, publishing his first scientific paper on the genus in 1952 before earning his PhD from the University of Helsinki in 1954. Kurtén said that he chose paleontology as his career path because he did not want to do anything "useful".

== Career ==
=== Scientific career ===
After receiving his PhD, Kurtén became a Docent at the University of Helsinki, a position he held until 1972. From 1972 until his death, he was a Professor at the university. Throughout his career, he frequently traveled to study paleontological collections throughout Europe and North America. He also did field work in Sweden, Spain, and Tunisia. He received several fellowships from foreign institutions and lectured at Harvard University.

He was a prominent writer of popular science. For his work in popular science, he received numerous awards including the Finnish state award for popular dissemination of knowledge (1970 and 1982), Counsellor of state Mauritz Hallberg's prize (1970) and UNESCO's Kalinga Prize (1988). He was also awarded MTV:n kulttuuripalkinto in 1984. Kurtén's research focused primarily on carnivorans, particularly prehistoric bears and hyenas. He wrote fifteen papers and one book about prehistoric bears and was the first person to study allometry in fossil teeth.

=== Fiction ===
Kurtén wrote his first novel in his late teens. He wrote in the genre of prehistoric fiction, combining elements of paleontology with science fiction. He authored a series of books about encounters between humans and Neanderthals, such as Dance of the Tiger. His works of fiction have been translated into over fourteen languages, although only two of his novels, Dance of the Tiger and Singletusk, have been translated into English.

== Personal life and death ==
Kurtén married Ruth Nordman in 1950, and they had four children named Solveig, Joachim, Andrea, and Marina. He and his family spent summers on Stängesholmen, where they enjoyed birding, walking, and picking berries. Kurtén enjoyed the sauna, and often went straight from the sauna into cold ocean water, which he said brought out his "viking blood". He did most of his writing in Stängesholmen.

Kurtén died in Helsinki in 1988 due to complications following brain surgery. The University of Helsinki has a paleontological club called the Björn Kurtén Club, named in his honor. Nordenskiöld-samfundet i Finland has an award named after him, the Björn Kurtén-award, given for "scientific or artistic achievements related to Kurtén's broad field of activity." The prehistoric cat species Prionailurus kurteni was named after Kurtén in 2024.

== Bibliography ==
=== Fiction ===
- Det nya jaktplanet, Schildt 1941
- Spåret från Ultima Esperanza, Bro 1945
- De tre korsen, Schildt 1948
- Den svarta tigern, Alba 1978
- 63 förstenade hjärtan, Alba 1980
- Mammutens rådare, Alba 1984

=== Scientific works (in alphabetical order) ===
- A history of coyote-like dogs (Canidae, Mammalia), Societas scientarum Fennica 1974
- A radiocarbon date for the cave bear remains (Ursus spelaeus) from Odessa, Societas scientiarum Fennica 1969
- Age groups in fossil mammals, Societas scientiarum Fennica 1953
- An attempted parallelization of the Quaternary mammalian faunas of China and Europe, Societas scientiarum Fennica 1960
- Bears and bear-dogs from the Vallesian of the Vallés-Penedés basin, Spain ; Written with Miguel Crusafont i Pairó, Societas scientarum Fennica 1976
- Before the Indians, Columbia University Press 1988
- Chronology and faunal evolution of the earlier European glaciations, Socieas scientiarum Fennica 1960
- Continental drift and the palaeogeography of reptiles and mammals, Societas scientiarum Fennica 1967
- Den felande länken, Societas scientiarum Fennica 1962
- Faunal turnover dates for the Pleistocene and late Pliocene, Societas scientiarum Fennica 1960
- Fossil Glutton (Gulo gulo (L.)) from Tornewton Cave, South Devon, Societas scientiarum Fennica 1973
- Geographic variation in size in the puma (Felis concolor), Societas scientiarum Fennica 1973
- Holarctic land connexions in the early Tertiary, Societas scientiarum Fennica 1966
- Late-glacial find of arctic fox [Alopex lagopus L.] from southwestern Finland, Societas scientiarum Fennica 1966
- Life and death of the pleistocene cave bear, Societas pro fauna et flora Fennica 1958
- Människans ursprung och utveckling, Bibliotekstjänst 1982
- Människans utveckling, Aldus/Bonnier 1963
- Människans utvecklingshistoria; Ihmisen kehityshistoria, Yleisradio 1973
- Några drag ur människans tidiga utvecklingshistoria, Societas scientiarum Fennica 1959
- Några paleobiogeografiska problemställningarl, 1971
- Observations on allometry in mammalian dentitions, Societas pro Fauna et Flora Fennica 1954
- On evolution and fossil mammals, Columbia University Press 1988
- On the articulation between the thoracic tergites of some common trilobite forms, Societas scientiarum Fennica 1949
- On the bears of the Holsteinian interglacial, 1959
- On the date of Peking Man, Societas scientiarum Fennica 1960
- On the evolution of the European wild cat, Felis silvestris Schreber ; Societas pro fauna et flora Fennica 1965
- On the longevity of mammalian species in the Tertiary, Socieas scientiarum Fennica 1958
- On the variation and population dynamics of fossil and recent mammal populations, Societas pro fauna et flora Fennica 1953
- Pleistocene bears of North America 1, Societas pro fauna et flora Fennica 1966
- Pleistocene bears of North America 2, Societas pro fauna et flora Fennica 1967
- Pleistocene jaguars in North America, Societas scientiarum Fennica 1973
- Pleistocene mammals and the Bering bridge, Societas scientiarum Fennica 1966
- Pleistocene mammals of Europe, Weidenfeld and Nicolson 1968
- Pleistocene mammals of North America; Written with Elaine Anderson, Columbia University Press 1980
- Sex dimorphism and size trends in the cave bear, Ursus spelaeus Rosenmüller and Heinroth, Societas pro fauna et flora Fennica 1955
- The age of mammals, Weidenfeld and Nicolson 1971
- The age of the Austral-opithecinae, University of Stockholm 1960
- The Carnivora of the Palestine caves, Societas pro fauna et flora Fennica 1965
- The Chinese Hipparion fauna, 1952
- The evolution of the polar bear, Ursus maritimus Phipps ; Societas pro fauna et flora Fennica 1964
- The Neogene wolverine Plesiogulo and the origin of Gulo (Carnivora, Mammalia), Societas pro Fauna et flora Fennica 1970
- The spotted hyena (Crocuta crocuta) from the middle Pleistocene of Mosbach at Wiesbaden, Germany ; Societas scientiarum Fennica 1962
- The type collection of Ictitherium robustum (Gervais, ex Nordmann) and the radiation of the Ictitheres ; Societas pro fauna et flora Fennica 1954
- Time and hominid brain size, Societas scientiarum Fennica 1971
- Transberingian relationship of Ursus arctos Linné (Brown and Grizzly bears), Societas scientarum Fennica 1973
- Urmänniskor och sabeltigrar, Schildt 1961
- Villafranchian Carnivores (Mammalia) from La Puebla de Valverde (Teruel, Spain), written with Miguel Crusafont i Pairó, Societas scientarum Fennica 1976
- Villfrancian faunal evolution, Societas scientiarum Fennica 1963
- Våra äldsta förfäder, Liber 1986
