= Sue Harrison (author) =

American author

Sue Harrison (born 1950) is an American author who wrote two trilogies of novels, the Ivory Carver Trilogy and the Storyteller Trilogy.

The Ivory Carver trilogy is set among the prehistoric Paleo-Aleut people of Western Alaska.
