= Clare Bell =

British author in the United States

- Born: 1952 (age 73–74); Hitchin, Hertfordshire, England
- Education: University of California, Santa Cruz; University of California, Davis
- Occupation: Novelist
- Writing career
- Period: 1983–present
- Genre: Fantasy
- Website: home.earthlink.net/~ratha13

Clare Bell (born 1952) is a British author in the United States best known for her Ratha series of young adult fantasy novels about prehistoric big cats. These books, also called the Named series, are about intelligent self-aware large cats who have puma, cheetah and lion characteristics, and are based on fossil creatures who are ancestors of the saber-tooth cat.

The first book in the series, Ratha's Creature appeared in 1983. Bell's love for big cats is also expressed in Tomorrow's Sphinx (about cheetahs in past and future Egypt) and The Jaguar Princess (a werecat (jaguar) woman in Aztec Mexico). Bell is also fascinated with flight, writing People of the Sky about Pueblo Indians who migrate from Earth to another planet and learn to ride winged aliens. Bell's short stories have appeared in the Witch World and CatFantastic (cats and magic) anthologies, both edited by science fiction and fantasy writer, Andre Norton.

Recently Bell composed Ratha's Island, an experimental novelette written specifically for the Twitter microblogging service, which intentionally limits posts to 140 characters or less so that they can be read on cellphones and other portable wireless devices. Ratha's Island is an early entry into the area of Y/A Twitter fiction and has been well received. It is similar to the phenomenon of cellphone novels which are popular in Japan. The piece ran on Twitter beginning on March 14, 2009 and ending on May 9, with blocks of 5-10 Tweets, appearing twice daily during that time. Ratha's Island also explored the possibilities of alternative evolution in hexapodal (six-legged) as opposed to quadrupedal (four-legged) prehistoric mammals that evolved on an isolated island.

== Biography ==
Clare Bell was born in 1952 in Hitchin, Hertfordshire, England and moved with her family to the United States in 1957. While growing up in Palo Alto, California, she became fascinated by prehistoric mammals and pored over Charles R. Knight's paintings in books on paleontology. After attending the University of California, Santa Cruz she used her training in biology and chemistry by working as a hydrological and geological field technician for the US Geological Survey, serving on the USGS research vessel Polaris, based in Redwood City, California. Returning to college under the Women in Engineering Program at the University of California, Davis, she then joined IBM in San Jose, California as an electrical engineer.

Inspired since childhood by Olaf Stapledon's novel Sirius, about a sheep dog with human-level intelligence, she began writing Ratha's Creature, the first novel in a series called The Named (also known as Ratha). Published in 1983 by Margaret K. McElderry Books, this debut novel won the International Reading Association's Children's Book Award and the PEN United States Literary Award for that year. Ratha's Creature was also adapted for television animation and aired as a CBS Storybreak episode in the late 1980s.

Leaving IBM in 1990 to begin a full-time writing career, Bell also became interested in electric vehicles. After converting a VW beetle to electric with a conversion kit, she began building, racing, repairing, designing, and racing electric cars. From 1992 to 1999 also became the editor of the Electric Auto Association's (a nationwide US electric car club) monthly newsletter, Current Events. As part of the Women's Electric Racing Team, she competed in the Arizona Public Service utility company's APS Solar and Electric 500 and APS Electrics electric vehicle races, held in Phoenix, Arizona from 1993 to 1997.

She also turned her electric vehicle experience into a profession, working as an electric vehicle engineer for CALSTART and private companies until 2003.

Bell found to her surprise that books written nearly twenty years ago still had fans and had been kept alive on the Internet. The first four Ratha titles were reissued as Firebird paperbacks in Summer and Fall 2007, and a new book, Ratha's Courage, was published by Imaginator Press in October, 2008. January 2013 saw the launch of a kickstarter project to create a graphic novel e-book of the first Ratha title.

Bell and her husband live in the hills west of Patterson, California, where they have built their own solar, wind and hydroelectric systems.

== List of works ==
=== Series novels ===
- Ratha, or The Books of the Named
  - Ratha's Creature (1983)
  - Clan Ground (1984)
  - Ratha and Thistle-chaser (1990)
  - Ratha's Challenge (1991)
  - Ratha's Courage (Imaginator Press, 2008)
- Ancient Tahiti, by Bell and M. Coleman Easton, under joint pseudonym Clare Coleman
  - Daughter of the Reef (1992)
  - Sister of the Sky (1993)
  - Child of the Dawn (1994)

=== Other novels ===
- Tomorrow's Sphinx (1986)
- People of the Sky (1989)
- The Jaguar Princess (1993)

=== Short stories ===
- "The Hunting of Lord Etsalian's Daughter" in anthology series Tales of the Witch World, edited by Witch World creator Andre Norton
- "The Damcat" in anthology series Catfantastic, eds. Norton and Martin H. Greenberg
- "Bomber and the Bismarck" in the Catfantastic series
- "A Tangled Tahitian Tale" in the Catfantastic series
- "Bonechewer's Legacy" (2009) in speculative fiction anthology Firebirds Soaring, ed. Sharyn November – Ratha series
- "Ratha's Island" (2009), electronically published on Twitter (archived December 2009) – Ratha series

=== Television adaptations ===
- "Ratha's Creature" (1985), episode of CBS Storybreak
