= Dance of the Tiger =

1978 novel by Björn Kurtén

First edition (publ. Alba)

Dance of the Tiger (Swedish: Den Svarta Tigern) is a novel by Finnish palaeontologist Björn Kurtén, published in 1978 and English translation in 1980. It is a prehistoric novel dealing with the interaction between Neanderthals and Cro-Magnons. A sequel, Singletusk, published in 1982, continues the story of the family.

== Plot ==
Set 35,000 years ago in Scandinavia, during a thaw in the great Ice Age, the novel follows a Cro-Magnon named Tiger as he tries to defeat Shelk, a tyrant and a hybrid (Neanderthal/Cro-Magnon), the man who killed his father. With his family and much of his tribe dead, Tiger meets, interacts, and allies himself with groups of Neanderthals. He eventually marries a Neanderthal woman.

== Depictions ==
Neanderthals are depicted as white-skinned, while Cro-Magnons are dark. Kurtén's skin color identification for both populations appears to agree with recent DNA studies, including those proposing the African origin of modern humans. His racial presentation of the Cro-Magnon is in contrast to Jean M. Auel's view in her Earth's Children series. Auel's initial book, published a few years later than Dance of the Tiger, portrayed Neanderthals as light-skinned and Cro-Magnons as more racially varied, either light or dark-skinned. The author himself says "The book is not intended to be a 'theory about interaction between Neanderthals and Modern Humans', it is just a fictive description of one possible scenario among several that might have taken place".

Cro-Magnon children and adults are portrayed as having smooth brows and small faces; the characteristic features of childhood act as "innate releasing mechanisms" for feelings of affection.

To the Whites, the Blacks were godlike, tall and eloquent, with a speech as varied and flexible as that of the birds. And there was something else. No White could look at the clear brow of a Black without feeling a mysterious tenderness, such as a child might evoke in the heart of his parents.

— Kurtén, p. 33, 5th printing, paperback

Kurtén postulates that this attraction led to intermarriage between the two people, which produced sterile offspring. He emphasizes the possibility of Neanderthal extinction through inter-breeding rather than through violence. He also presents social differences between the two groups, presenting the Cro-Magnon people as more aggressive, practicing slavery and choosing violence to solve social problems. The Neanderthal society, based on a matriarchal system, is drawn as peace-loving with elaborate social rituals designed to resolve problems.

== Reception ==
The novel is known for its plausibility and accuracy. Kurtén's supposition that Neanderthals and ancestors of modern Homo sapiens occupied same areas in the same time in Europe has been confirmed by fossil evidence.

Kurtén has managed to insinuate into his story—in a way so subtle and natural that we can scarcely recognize he is teaching as well as novelizing—every fact and theory that I know (and several, undoubtedly, that I don't) about Neanderthals, Cro-Magnons, human evolution during the Ice Age, glacial geology, and ecology and behavior of the great Ice Age mammals, including mammoths and saber-toothed tigers.

— Stephen Jay Gould, introduction to Dance of the Tiger, 1980.

Kurtén was not the first novelist to examine the subject; for instance, author William Golding also examined the issue of Neanderthal extinction in The Inheritors.

== Release details ==
- Originally published as Den Svarta Tigern, ALBA Publishing, Stockholm, Sweden, 1978.
- English translation copyright, 1980, Björn Kurtén.
- English translation, Random House, New York, 1980.
- Pantheon Books paperback editions, initially published September 1980, Fifth printing October 1983. ISBN 0-425-06477-8.
