= Robert Kimmel Smith =

American children's writer (1930–2020)

Robert Kimmel Smith (July 31, 1930 – April 18, 2020) was an American novelist and children's author.

Smith was born in Brooklyn, New York and first learned to read from his mother Sally. Smith was inspired to become a writer at age eight, when he became bedbound for three months while suffering rheumatic fever and amused himself by reading books, then inventing new characters and endings for the stories. He attended Brooklyn College in 1947 but dropped out after a year when he proved unable to do chemistry or calculus. He served in the U.S. Army from 1951 to 1953, spending time stationed overseas in Germany. When he returned to America, he married his wife, Claire Medney, in 1954. Together, they had two children, Heidi and Roger. Between 1957 and 1965, Smith was a copywriter at an ad agency, and a partner and creative director at Smith and Toback from 1967 to 1970.

Smith started writing stories for young readers "by accident" while telling his daughter bedtime stories, which he then wrote down. He also took inspiration from his own childhood; Jelly Belly refers to his memories of being the fattest child in his elementary school. In 1970, he became a full-time writer; his first children's book, Chocolate Fever, was published in 1972 and won the Massachusetts Children's Book Award. As of 2001, Chocolate Fever had sold over 2 million paperback copies and was listed at number 119 on Publishers Weekly's all-time list of bestselling children's paperbacks. His other works for young readers include The War with Grandpa (1987), Bobby Baseball (1989), Mostly Michael (1987), and The Squeaky Wheel (1990), a touching but humorous story about a child coping with his parents' divorce. War with Grandpa was made into a movie in 2020, starring Robert De Niro and directed by Tim Hill. The film received generally negative reviews from critics and grossed $40 million worldwide against a $38 million production budget.

Smith also penned several novels for adults, most notably Sadie Shapiro's Knitting Book (1973), and its two sequels Sadie Shapiro in Miami (1977) and Sadie Shapiro, Matchmaker (1980); as well as Jane's House (1982). The latter was made into a 1994 television movie of the same name, starring James Woods and Anne Archer.

== See also ==
- The War with Grandpa (film)
