= The Story of Ab =

1897 novel by Stanley Waterloo

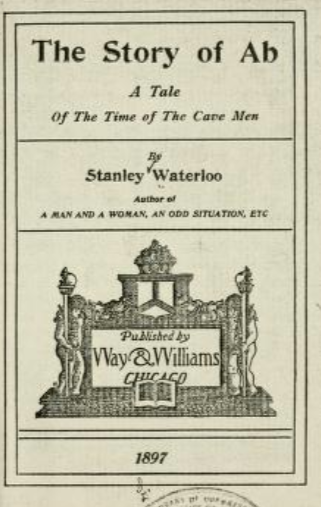
- Title page for The Story of Ab (1897)
- Author: Stanley Waterloo
- Language: English
- Genre: Science fiction
- Publisher: Way & Williams
- Publication date: 1897

The Story of Ab, or The Story of Ab: A Tale of the Time of the Cave Man, is a novel written by Stanley Waterloo in 1897.

== Plot summary ==
Ab is a Stone Age boy who grows to young manhood amid the many dangers of his times. With his friend, Oak, he digs a pit and catches a baby rhinoceros, participates in a mammoth hunt with the tribe to prove himself a man, and courts the young women from a neighboring tribe. One girl in particular, Lightfoot, holds the attention of both men, and Ab is forced to kill his friend in a savage fight. He wins Lightfoot for his mate, but is haunted by guilt for his murdered companion. As Ab grows older, he helps the tribe kill a marauding sabre-tooth tiger, leads his people in a great battle against an invading tribe, and eventually becomes the leader of the cave men, and the patriarch of a large personal family. Ab is used by the author to support his contention that there was no sharp division between the Paleolithic and Neolithic periods, that man learned to make fine, polished tools and weapons gradually and naturally, as Ab does. During his life Ab invents and perfects the bow and arrow, and is the first of the primitives to domesticate wolves as pets.
