= The Books of the Named =

Series of novels by Clare Bell, 1983–2008

- First edition of the first book
- Ratha's Creature; Clan Ground; Ratha and Thistle-chaser; Ratha's Challenge; Ratha's Courage
- Author: Clare Bell
- Language: English
- Genre: Prehistoric fiction, Speculative fiction, Xenofiction, Adventure
- Published: 1983–2008
- No. of books: 5

The Books of the Named (also known as the Ratha series) is a series of young adult xenofictive prehistoric fiction novels by Clare Bell. The books center around a society of sapient prehistoric cats, the Named, who herd prehistoric horses and deer and are in conflict with a non-sentient group of cats called the Unnamed. The series follows Ratha, who discovers the "Red Tongue", fire, permanently changing their society. The series has received positive reviews and has been compared to the book Watership Down.

== Books ==
1. Ratha's Creature (1983)
2. Clan Ground (1984)
3. Ratha and Thistle-chaser (1990)
4. Ratha's Challenge (1994)
5. Ratha's Courage (2008)

== Synopsis ==
=== Ratha's Creature (1983) ===
The Named are a clan of a strong, highly sapient, almost cheetah-like species of Dinaelurus nimravids. They have laws, languages, and traditions, and live by herding some of the local prey creatures, such as anchitheriine equids called dapplebacks and protoceratids called three-horns (or tri-corns). Surrounding the Named are the more numerous not very sapient Unnamed, who occasionally prey on the Named clan’s herds. Mating between Named and Un-Named is forbidden, since the clan believes that the resulting young will always be born Un-Named.

Ratha, a young female of the Named, bucks the clan tradition of male dominance by training with the herding teacher, Thakur, to become a herder. All the herders are male except for Fessran, a strong-willed fully-grown female who became a herder before Meoran, Ratha's uncle, took over leadership (who is now ruling the clan in a tyrannical way). Attacks by the Unnamed are driving Ratha's clan close to the edge of extinction. Only her discovery of how to tame fire (The "Red Tongue”) offers the clan a chance to survive. Meoran opposes Ratha because of her unusual partnership with fire and drives her out of the clan. In exile among the Unnamed, Ratha meets a lone male and discovers that the clan is wrong about some of the Unnamed - he speaks the language of the Named very well and is as bright as any Named clan member. She dubs him "Bonechewer". He teaches her new ways to hunt, the two mate and she has his young. When the cubs don’t develop according to her expectations, she realizes that they are not as intelligent as her. She flies into a rage, attacking Bonechewer, biting and crippling the female cub, Thistle-Chaser, and abandoning her mate and the litter.

Returning to the clan at Thakur‘s bidding, Ratha reacquires her "creature”, the Red Tongue. With it, she overthrows and kills Meoran. When the Unnamed attack again, she, Thakur and Fessran lead the Named clan in striking back with a new weapon, fire. The enemy flees in terror. After the battle, Ratha emerges as clan leader. She makes Fessran chief of the Firekeepers, those who build and tend fire for the clan. The Firekeepers also wield torches in battle. Ratha gives them each a torch, and they fight the Unnamed. Ratha’s victory is bittersweet; Bonechewer is fatally injured in the fight and Ratha finds him dying. Despite everything, she still loves him and is wounded by his death. She is also troubled by the changes Red Tongue has made in her people. However, she knows that with the Red Tongue, the Named will survive.

=== Clan Ground (1984) ===
After the death of Meoran, young Ratha now leads the Named using the strength of the Red Tongue. She oversees the Firekeepers, but she often wonders if the power of fire has corrupted them all. When Orange-eyes, a politically astute newcomer, joins the clan, Ratha is forced to decide how she will keep control or if she wants to keep control of the clan at all. The book begins one year after the first, with the Named holding a feast in celebration of Ratha's defeat of the Unnamed and the birth of the Red-Tongue. A young UnNamed yearling comes to the clan seeking food and protection, and the Firekeepers taunt him and scorch his fur. Ratha however, is impressed by his courage in front of the Red-Tongue, and sees intelligence in his eyes. She allows him to join the clan, only to work for the Firekeepers and help them with small tasks.

The newcomer, Orange-Eyes, has a limited vocabulary and understanding of clan life. He is shown to possibly be a different species than them, as he grows to be huge in comparison and grow long sabers. Orange-Eyes, now renamed Shongshar, mates with a clan female Bira, and has two cubs with her. Their cubs fail to show any signs of intelligence, and Ratha orders him to take them beyond clan borders and abandon them. Shongshar becomes bitter and enraged at Ratha's decision, and begins to build a cult of fire-worshippers in a nearby cave. Shongshar overthrows Ratha using the power of the Red-Tongue, and drives her out of her own clan. Ratha and Thakur devise a plan to flood the fire cave, where the heart of the Red Tongue is kept. They flood the cave by re-routing a stream above the cave, and Ratha kills Shongshar and retakes her place as clan leader.

=== Ratha and Thistle-chaser (1990) ===
Thistle-chaser, the daughter of the Named clan leader, Ratha, has no recollection of her past or true name. Due to this, she lives alone on a coastline, befriending the that reside there, and goes by 'Newt'. In her dreams, a creature she knows as the Dreambiter, which bites her foreleg, often makes her go into seizures and fits of panic. A clan cat, Thakur comes across Thistle-chaser while searching for water. He befriends her and starts having her swim in a lagoon which acts as therapy for her shriveled leg. When he reports of the water and seamares (desmostylians) that live there, Ratha decides to move the clan and their livestock to the coast, going as far as to capture the seamares. Thistle-chaser is upset by this and frees them, making Ratha, who refuses to believe that Thistle-chaser is her daughter, order the clan to attack Thistle-chaser if she tries anything like it again.

Thistle-chaser eventually learns that Ratha is her mother and speculates that the Dreambiter will be destroyed if Ratha was killed. Ratha bit Thistle-chaser when she was young, which was the cause of the Dreambiter. Thistle-chaser decides to attack Ratha and the two get into a fight. When Ratha gets her foot stuck between two rocks, Mishanti, an Unnamed cub which Ratha was going to abandon, gets caught in the fray and tries to defend Ratha. In her fury, Thistle-chaser goes after him, only to be stopped by Ratha, who calls her names and brings her back to reality. Thakur and Fessran, another clan cat, arrive soon and together with Thistle-chaser bring Ratha and Mishanti to safety. Through these events, Ratha is able to admit that Thistle-chaser is her daughter and Thistle-chaser is able to forgive her mother. Mishanti, being an orphan and lacking any proof that he is sentient, is taken in by Thistle-chaser who will raise him and bring out his hidden sentience.

=== Ratha's Challenge (1994) ===
As Ratha struggles to reconcile with Thistle-chaser, the Named are locked in another struggle when they confront a strange clan of highly sapient Dinaelurus called the Face-Tail Hunter Tribe (so named for their capability of bringing down mammutids called Face-Tails) who are driven by and completely dependent on the telepathic song of their leader, True-of-voice. After an accident brings down True-of-voice and leaves him on the brink of death, the tribe is left helpless. Thistle-chaser, who unlike the other Named can listen to the "song", becomes companions with a felled tribe male, Quiet Hunter, who himself becomes able to live more like the Named. Thistle-chaser and Quiet Voice convince the Named to help save True-of-voice, and the two tribes become tenuous allies.

=== Ratha's Courage (2008) ===
The Named and the hunter Tribe have entered into an uneasy alliance as neighbors. When Quiet Hunter, a young member of the Tribe, asks the Named if they can share their fire to warm the Tribe's cubs, a strange young male steals the Red Tongue in an attempt to harness its powers. However, he is young and foolish, and he accidentally starts a canyon fire which kills many of his tribe, mainly the Tribe's breeding-age females.

When the mating season comes the leader of the Tribe, True-of-voice, ends up driving out the younger males from his tribe because they are competition for females. New-Singer (True-of-Voice's son) leads the outcast young males with his song, and wages an attack on the Named. New-Singer's Tribe kills the majority of the cubs and kidnaps the Named females, with the exception of Ratha. Ratha attempts to rescue her clan sisters by sneaking into the new Tribe's camp, but ends up in captivity herself. New-Singer waits until all the females are in heat, and then begins a courting circle. During this frenzy, it is revealed that the strange young male who stole the fire was Night-who-eats-Stars, Ratha's long lost son. Two young Named cubs, Mishanti and Bundi, end up helping the Named males in destroying the courting circle with their "Rumblers", and the young Tribe members are driven away.

== Publication history ==
Ratha and Thistle-chaser was originally released in 1990, a sequel to both Ratha's Creature and Clan Ground. The fourth book was released in 1994. The fifth book was sold to Sharyn November, editor for Viking Children's, in a deal in 2005, which included a reissue of the first four books in the series through her Firebird Books imprint. An animated movie was made based on the book in the mid to late '80s for CBS Storybreak, which created adaptations of modern and classic children's books. The book was the 1984 winner of the International Reading Association Award.

== Themes ==
Recurring themes throughout the series are leadership and challenge; one commentator described the series as both prehistoric and futuristic in its portrayal of the feline society. The first book is also thematically centered around evolution. The fourth book, Ratha's Challenge, explores themes of societal and family relations, as well as individuality. One reviewer said the first book's narrative contained parallels with the "painful" evolution of human society, in addition to the power struggles that threatened to herald the return of "savagery". Though the characters are animals, the book explores human themes and concepts; Ratha follows the archetypal hero's journey throughout the first book.

== Reception ==
Trev Jones, writing for the School Library Journal, praised the first book, calling it "difficult", but that it was "charged with powerful emotions". He praised the growth of Ratha as a character, and complimented the writing of the characters as "skillfully developed". Ben and Beth Nelms, writing for the English Journal, said the novel was "slow-paced at first", but praised Bell's attention to detail. David Bratman of Mythprint praised the first book's writing as "velvet-smooth" compared to the other works of first novelists, in addition to well-edited and "ingeniously conceived", though said it was not "finely-polished by any means". He compared the book to Watership Down, with the characters being clearly cats but with the complexity to satisfy human readers. Another commentator described Ratha;'s Creature as "absorbing, gripping, rich in texture and imagination".

The descriptions in the books have been praised. Polese praised the fourth book's "vivid descriptions" of the life of the characters and their society and its depiction of Thistle-Chaser's struggle in growing up, though noted it contained what she described as an "awkward re-capitulation of the earlier books". In her view, this reduced the quality of the early chapters. VOYA magazine praised the descriptive writing of the fifth book, as well as its characterization. English Journal said it contained "vivid descriptions" and that the dialogue "capture[d] and [held]" the reader. Sally Estes of The Booklist praised the writing in the fourth book, but noted that those who didn't know the story up to that point may have difficulty understanding it; she also said that there may be too much introspection in the book.

The characterization of the stories have been singled out for praise. Polese praised the series as a whole for the portrayal of its feline protagonists. Polese said that Ratha herself may most be appreciated by adult readers, as a "guilt-ridden mother". The second book was praised in the School Library Journal, with the reviewer singling out the characterization, though the reviewer noted it as not as "intensity dramatic" as the first. The third book was reviewed by Carolyn Polese, who in a starred review praised the novel for its writing, saying that there were "no easy answers" to be found in it, and called it "powerful". She praised its portrayal of emotional trauma, which she described as "clear-sighted", "both painful and healing in its accuracy".
