= William Sarabande =

Author

William Sarabande is the pen name for Joan Lesley Hamilton Cline who was born in Hollywood, California. Sarabande began writing at the age of 17 and was first published in 1979.

Cline (Sarabande) is the author of the First Americans series of novels published by Bantam Books.

== Wolves of the Dawn ==
First published in 1986, Wolves of the Dawn is the tale of an ancient clan of Celtic Britain at the beginning of the Bronze Age.

== First Americans Book Series ==
Set in the ice age, this series of books tell the story of the first people to enter America from Siberia, trekking through the Bering Strait. The books provide an insight into what life might have been like for our ancestors. Life was harsh and the books describe a reality very different to that described in the books by Jean M. Auel.

There are eleven books to the series, the first four telling the story of Torka and his family, the next five telling about the lives of another group of people. The final two books in the series are about new families once again.

- Beyond the Sea of Ice (1987)
- Corridor of Storms (1988)
- Forbidden Land (1989)
- Walkers of the Wind (1990)
- The Sacred Stones (1991)
- Thunder in the Sky (1992)
- The Edge of the World (1993)
- Shadow of the Watching Star (1995)
- Face of the Rising Sun (1996)
- Time Beyond Beginning (1998)
- Spirit Moon (2000)
