= Idaho Museum of Natural History =

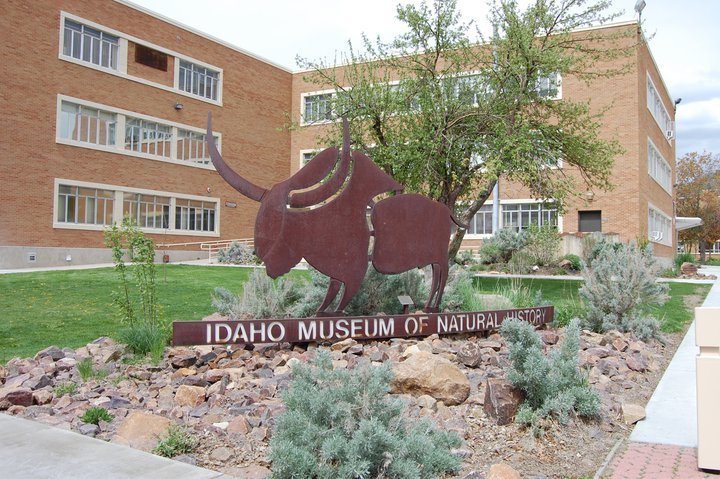
- The Idaho Museum of Natural History on the ISU Campus
- Established: 1934
- Location: Pocatello, Idaho, United States
- Coordinates: 42.866859°N 112.433312°W
- Type: Natural history museum
- Director: Dr. Leif Tapanila
- Website: www.imnh.isu.edu

The Idaho Museum of Natural History (IMNH) is the official state natural history museum of Idaho, located on the campus of Idaho State University (ISU) in Pocatello. Founded in 1934, it has collections in anthropology, vertebrate paleontology, earth science, and the life sciences. Additionally, it contains an archive of documents and ethnographic photographs.

== History ==
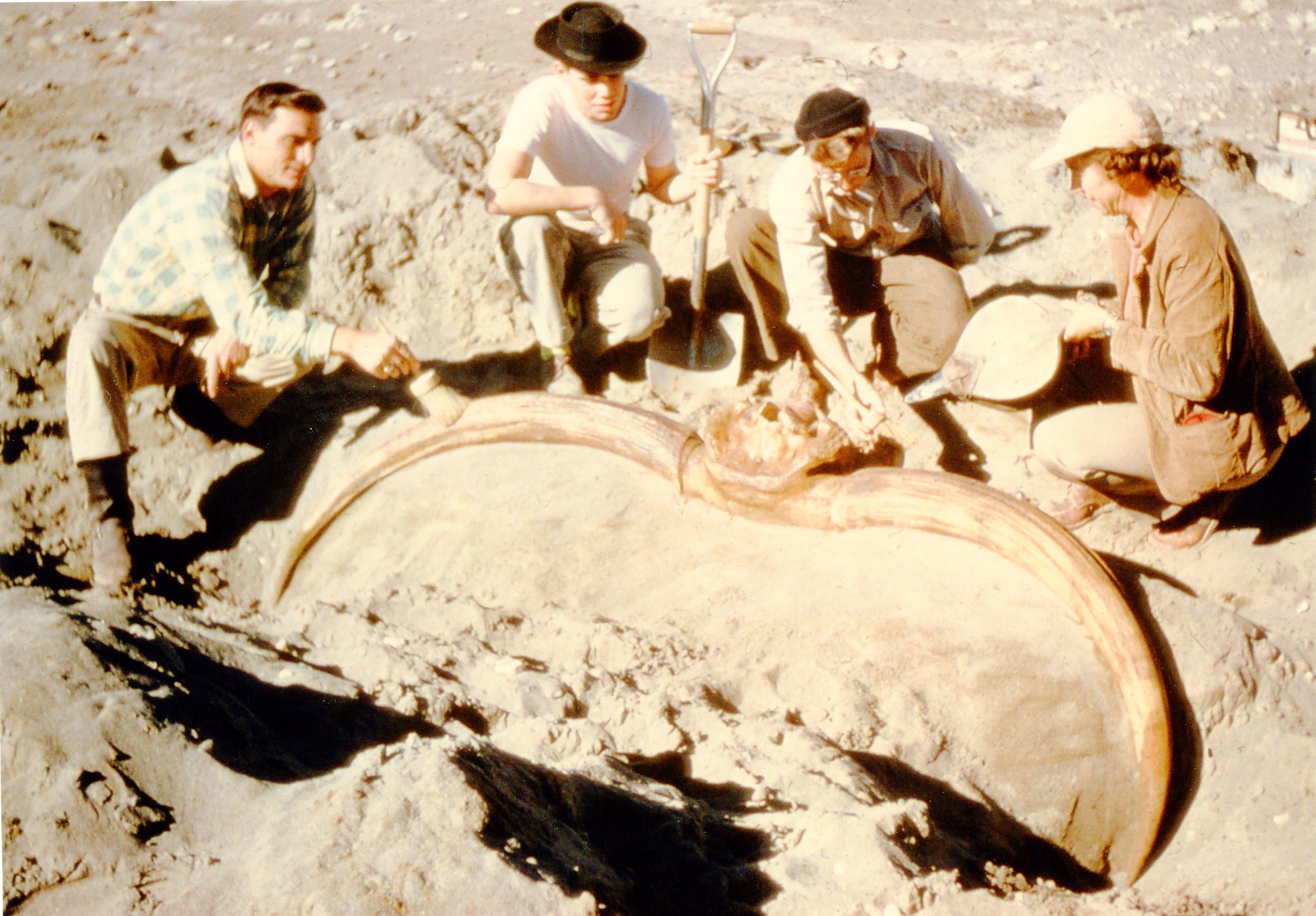
Paleontologist Marie Hopkins and crew excavating a bison latifrons

The founding of the IMNH can be traced back to 1934 when a group of dedicated professors and researchers decided to collect, preserve, and display the region's natural and cultural heritage. The Museum was originally established as the Historical Museum at the Southern Branch of the University of Idaho. In the beginning, the Museum's collection consisted of 5,000 objects that were primarily anthropological, archaeological, and historical artifacts that were donated by the Pocatello Chamber of Commerce, faculty, and supporters of the university's Southern Branch.

The Museum was governed by a 17-member Historic Museum Committee until the mid-1950s when it was renamed the Idaho State College Museum. By 1963, the Idaho State College was renamed Idaho State University and the Museum changed its name to the Idaho State University Museum.

In 1977, the museum shifted its focus toward natural history, the Ray J. Davis Herbarium, and zoological collections. A majority of the collections were transferred from the Idaho State University Department of Biological Sciences to the museum. Also during this time, the Idaho State University Museum acquired historical collections from the Idaho State Historical Society, the Bannock County Historical Society, and the Idaho State University Library.

In May 1977, the Idaho State Board of Education adopted a resolution requesting that Governor John V. Evans designate the Idaho State University Museum as the Idaho Museum of Natural History (IMNH) and signed into law on July 1, 1977. In 1986, the Idaho State Legislature confirmed the IMNH as Idaho's official state museum of natural history.

== Mission statement ==
The Idaho Museum of Natural History actively nurtures an understanding of and delight in Idaho's natural and cultural heritage. As the official state museum of natural history, it acquires, preserves, studies, interprets and displays natural and cultural objects for Idaho residents, visitors and the world's community of students and scholars. The Museum also supports and encourages Idaho's other natural history museums through mentoring and training in sound museological practices.

== Collections ==
IMNH houses over 500,000 specimens in collections. The Museum collects, preserves, and documents the natural history of Idaho and the Intermountain West. Collections are divided into three areas: anthropology, earth sciences, and life sciences. A majority of the artifacts found at IMNH have been recovered and analyzed by staff and students of Idaho State University.

=== Anthropology ===
Anthropology is the study of human cultural diversity, archaeology, language, human biology, and evolution. The anthropology collection focuses on Idaho, but is not limited to the region. The collection represents a number of human artifacts which range from the Late Ice Age in Idaho to modern bead working traditions. These collections emphasize the diverse range of research and educational opportunities within the anthropological collections.

=== Earth Science ===
The earth science collection focuses on the natural history of rocks, minerals, and fossils. Specimens within the earth science collection focus on a number of different studies including paleontology, geology, paleobotany, and comparative osteology.

=== Life Science ===
The life science collection comprises a number of life science studies including the study of living organisms such as plants, animals, and human beings. The Museum's life science collection is one of the most complete collections of the biological makeup of Idaho. The Ray J. Davis Herbarium houses over 70,000 pressed plants, bryophytes, fungi, and lichens. The zoological collection consists of roughly 1,200 mammals, 1,800 birds, 2,500 reptiles, and 1,000 fish.

== Exhibits ==
IMNH exhibits come directly from the museum's collections and help describe the natural and cultural history of the surrounding area.

=== Anthropology ===
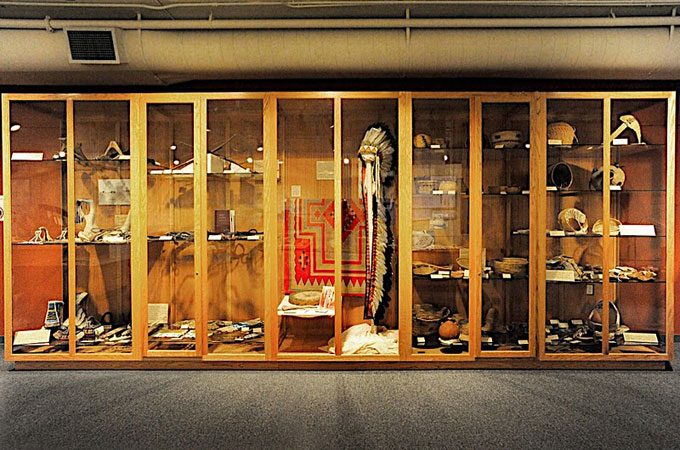
IMNH displays a diverse collection of artifacts collected from Idaho's Native people

The anthropology displays within the gallery represent the peoples of Idaho both past and present. The displays represent how the peoples of Idaho lived, survived, and used the landscapes, ecosystems, and geology of Idaho. The exhibits contain ethnographic material, archaeological material, replicas, historic and modern photographs, and historic audio recordings in several Native Idahoan languages.

=== Earth Science ===
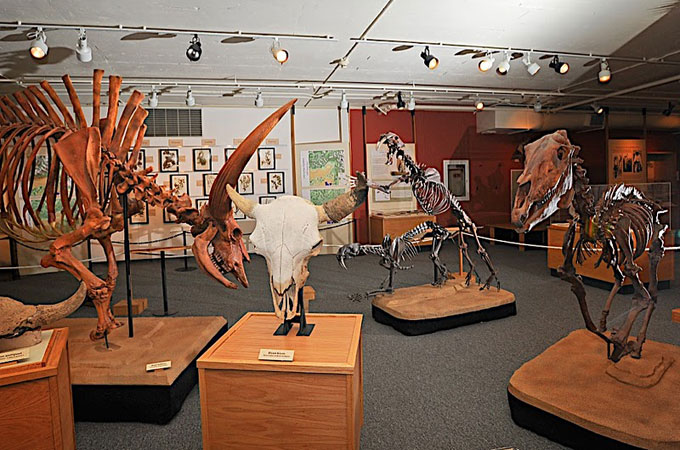
A few of the earth science exhibits on display at IMNH

The Earth Science exhibits provide insight into Idaho's geology, trackways of Idaho, and Ice-age megafauna. The Idaho Geology exhibits display a number of artifacts from minerals to fossils. The geology exhibits allow individuals to discover and learn about the geology of Idaho by providing individuals with hands-on activities. Trackways exhibits display ancient footprints left in sandstone by animals. Footprints that can be found in these exhibits vary from spiders, dinosaurs, and early mammals. The Ice-age Megafauna exhibits display the areas fossil history. These exhibits allow individuals to discover the skeletons of large prehistoric creatures such as saber tooth cats, giant bison, and the Hagerman horse.

=== Life Science ===
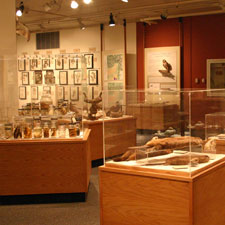
IMNH has one of the most diverse life science exhibits in the Idaho

The Life Science exhibits highlight the diverse flora and fauna of the Snake River plains. Some of the artifacts that are currently on display include a diverse array of rodents, including flying squirrels, kangaroo rats, beavers, and marmots. Other artifacts on display include owls and sage groups. The Life Science exhibits also display a diverse collection of native reptiles, amphibians, and fish of Southern Idaho. Lastly, the Ray J. Davis Herbarium allows IMNH to display a wide arrangement of native plants, some of which are extinct. Plants that are on display include the yellow glacier lily, camas, syringe, and many more.

== Role of Idaho State University ==
The IMNH was established under Idaho Statutes with the intention of:

Recognizing the importance of our natural heritage to citizens of the state of Idaho, and the need for a state museum of natural history which would preserve and interpret natural history objects and which would provide educational services about our natural heritage for both residents and visitors through its own facilities and by supporting and encouraging local municipal natural history museums throughout the state of Idaho, there is hereby created and established at Idaho State University a state museum of natural history to be known as the Idaho Museum of Natural History, where tangible objects and documents reflecting our natural heritage may be collected, preserved, studied, interpreted, and displayed for educational purposes.

Under Idaho Statute, IMNH is intended to display Idaho's natural history. However, IMNH is also used for academic purposes. The museum allows students the opportunity to conduct research on many of the artifacts that are in the museums collection.
