= Neronian =

Neronian may refer to

- The Roman emperor Nero
- An industry of the Cro-Magnons, the first modern humans in Europe
