= Aurignacian =

Upper Paleolithic culture of Europe

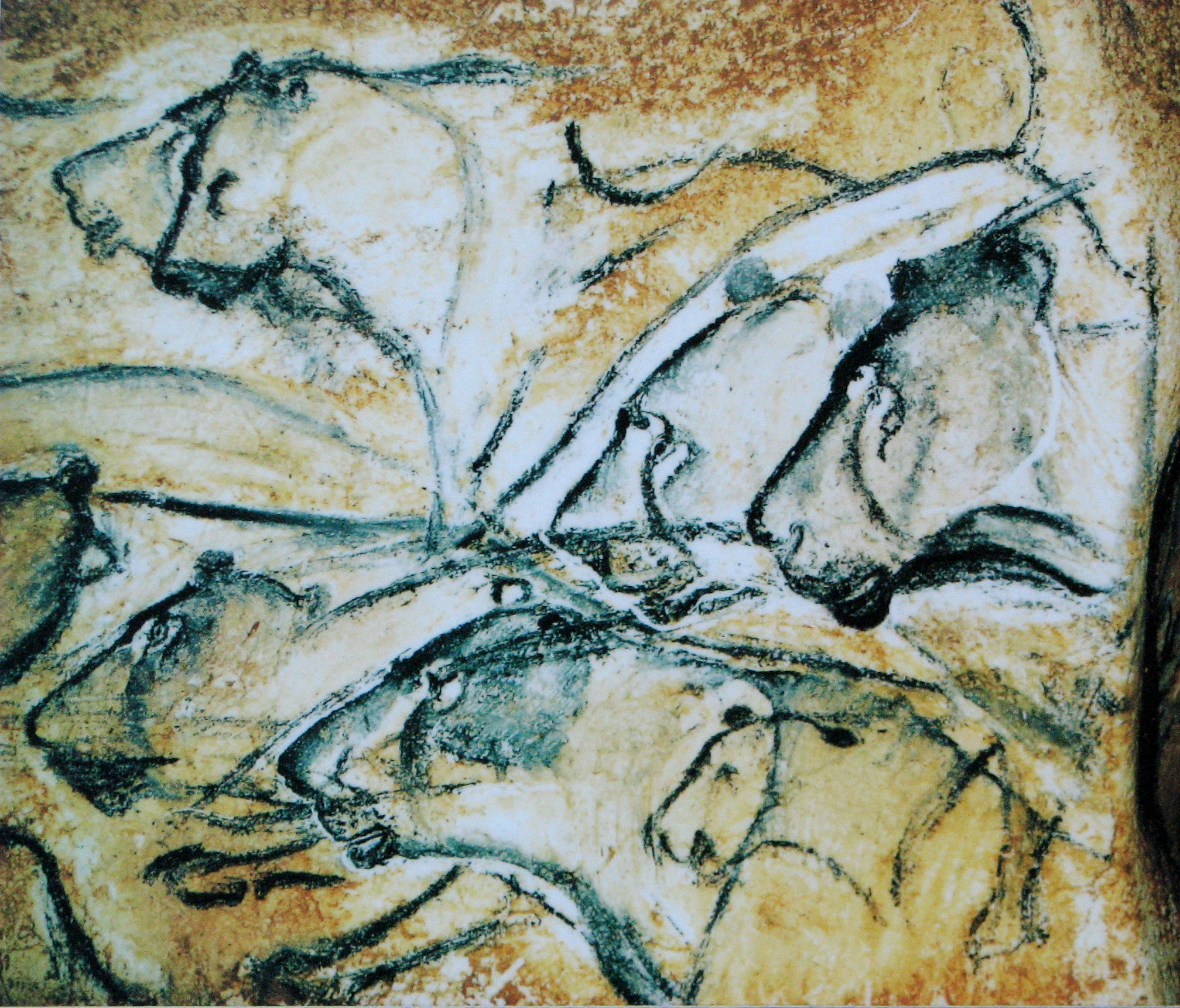
- Cave lion drawings from the Chauvet Cave, 37,000 to 33,500 years old, and a map of Aurignacian sites
- Geographical range: Eurasia
- Period: Upper Paleolithic
- Dates: c. 43,000 – c. 28,000 BP
- Type site: Aurignac
- Preceded by: Ahmarian, Châtelperronian
- Followed by: Gravettian
- Defined by: Breuil and Cartailhac, 1906

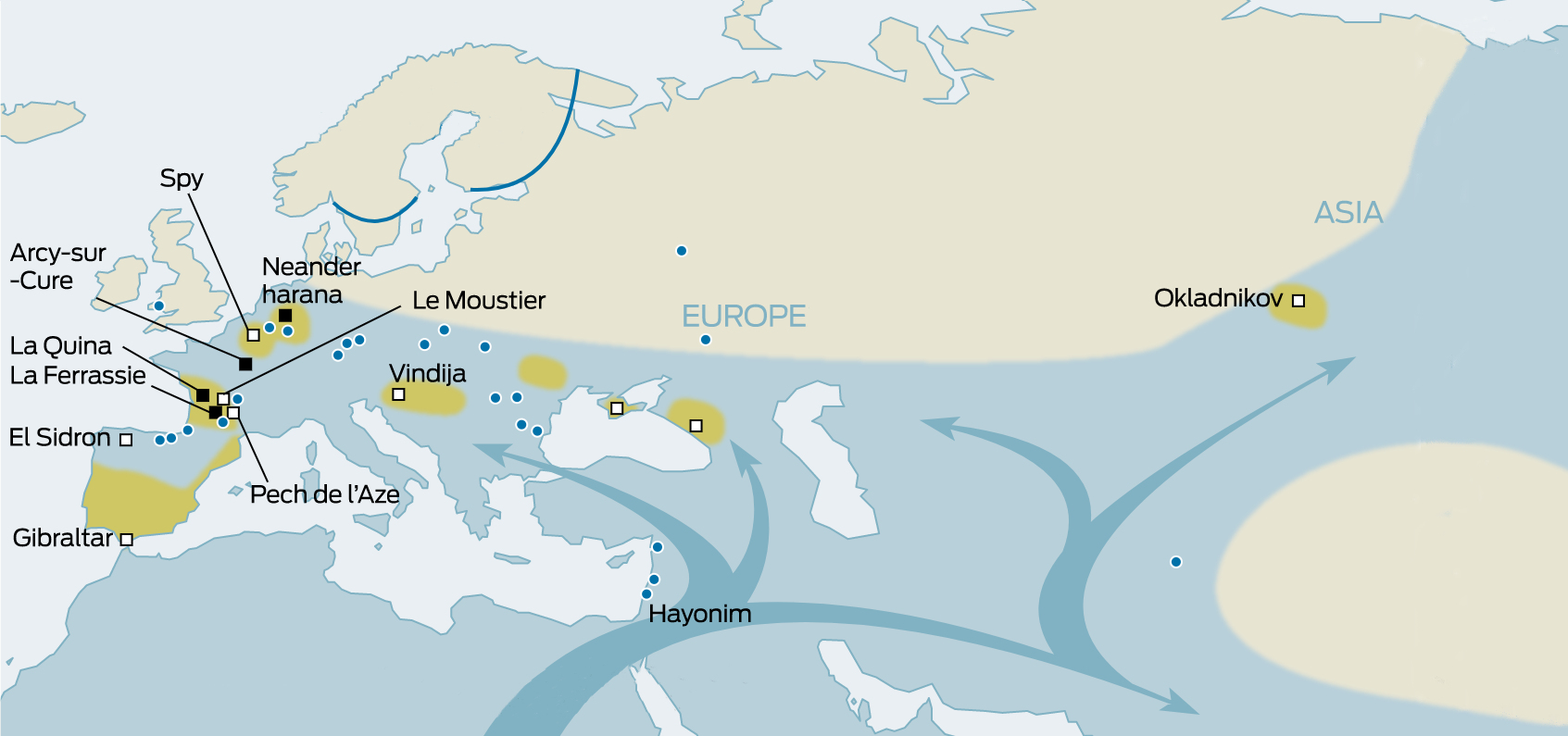
The expansion of early modern humans from the Levant where the Levantine Aurignacian stage has been identified

The Aurignacian (/ɔːrɪɡˈneɪʃən/) is an archaeological industry of the Upper Paleolithic associated with Early European modern humans (EEMH) lasting from 43,000 to 26,000 years ago in most areas and lasting until about 17,000 years ago in Ukraine in the form of the Epi-Aurignacian. The Upper Paleolithic first developed in the Levant, where the Emiran period and the Ahmarian period form the first periods of the Upper Paleolithic, corresponding to the first stages of the expansion of Homo sapiens out of Africa. They then migrated to Europe and created the first European culture of modern humans, the Aurignacian.

The Proto-Aurignacian and the Early Aurignacian stages are dated between about 43,000 and 37,000 years ago. The Aurignacian proper lasted from about 37,000 to 33,000 years ago. A Late Aurignacian phase transitional with the Gravettian dates to about 33,000 to 26,000 years ago. The type site is the Cave of Aurignac, Haute-Garonne, south-west France. The main preceding period is the Mousterian of the Neanderthals.

One of the oldest examples of figurative art, the Venus of Hohle Fels, comes from the Aurignacian or Proto-Gravettian and is dated to between 40,000 and 35,000 years ago (though earlier figurative art may now be known, such as at the Lubang Jeriji Saléh site in Indonesia). It was discovered in September 2008 in a cave at Schelklingen in Baden-Württemberg in western Germany. The German Lion-man figure is given a similar date range.

A Levantine Aurignacian culture is known from the Levant, with a type of blade technology very similar to the European Aurignacian, following chronologically the Emiran and Early Ahmarian in the same area of West Asia, and also closely related to them. The Levantine Aurignacian may have preceded European Aurignacian, but there is a possibility that the Levantine Aurignacian was rather the result of reverse influence from the European Aurignacian; this remains unsettled.

== Main characteristics ==
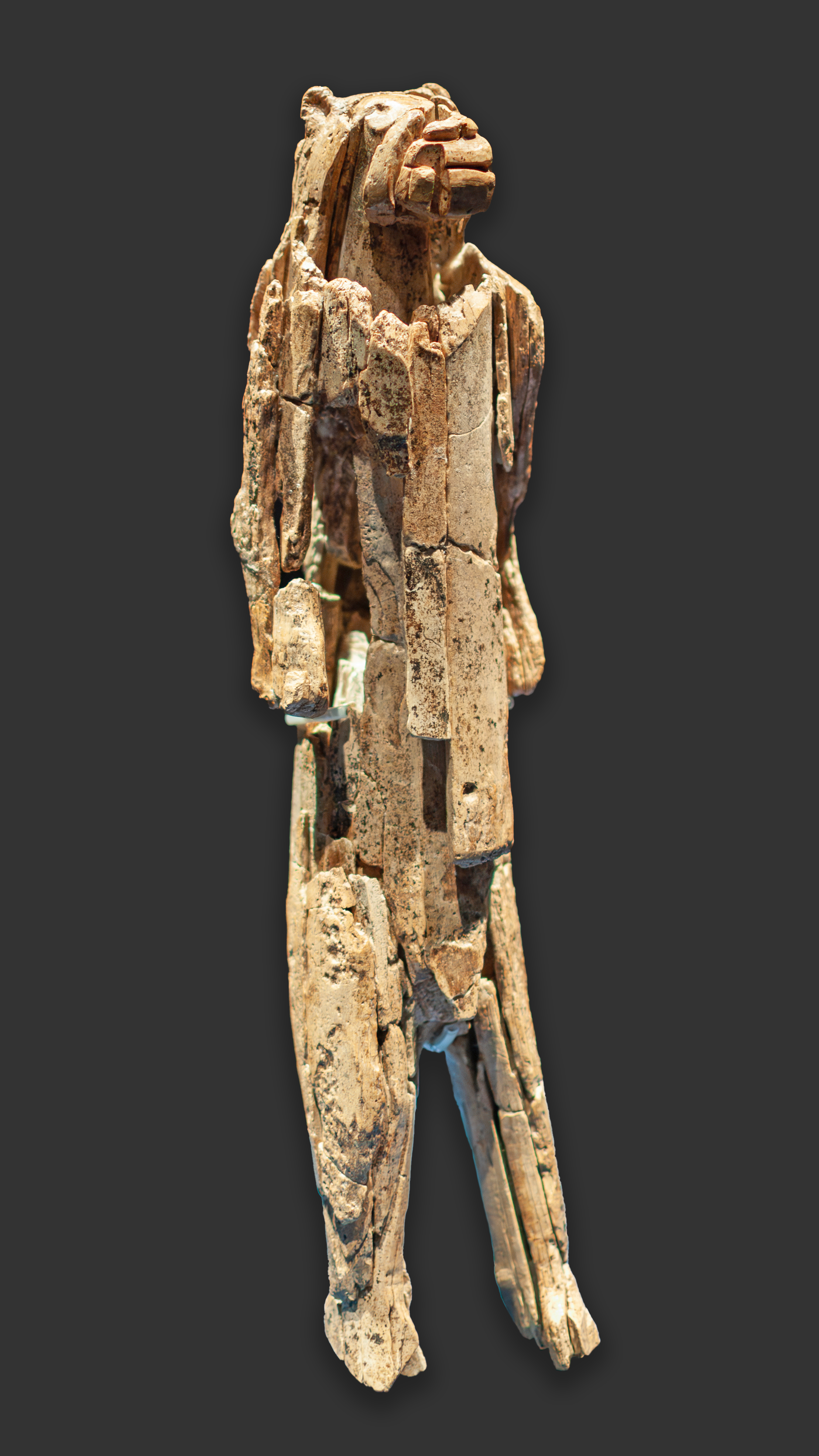
The Lion-man of Hohlenstein-Stadel, Germany, 40,000 BP

The Aurignacians are part of the wave of anatomically modern humans thought to have spread from Africa through West Asia into Paleolithic Europe, and became known as European early modern humans, or Cro-Magnons. This wave of anatomically modern humans includes fossils of the Ahmarian, Bohunician, Aurignacian, Gravettian, Solutrean and Magdalenian cultures, extending throughout the Last Glacial Maximum (LGM), covering the period of roughly 48,000 to 15,000 years ago. In terms of population, the Aurignacian cultural complex is chronologically associated with the human remains of Goyet Q116-1, while the subsequent eastern Gravettian is associated with the Vestonice cluster.

The Aurignacian tool industry is characterized by worked bone or antler points with grooves cut in the bottom. Their flint tools include fine blades and bladelets struck from prepared cores rather than using crude flakes. The people of this culture also produced some of the earliest known cave art, such as the animal engravings at Trois Freres and the paintings at Chauvet Cave in southern France. They also made pendants, bracelets, and ivory beads, as well as three-dimensional figurines. Perforated rods, thought to be spear throwers or shaft wrenches, also are found at their sites.

== Art ==
Aurignacian figurines have been found depicting faunal representations of the time period associated with now-extinct mammals, including mammoths, rhinoceros, and tarpan, along with anthropomorphized depictions that may be interpreted as some of the earliest evidence of religion.

Many 35,000-year-old animal figurines were discovered in the Vogelherd Cave in Germany. One of the horses, amongst six tiny mammoth and horse ivory figures found previously at Vogelherd, was sculpted as skillfully as any piece found throughout the Upper Paleolithic. The production of ivory beads for body ornamentation was also important during the Aurignacian. The famous paintings in Chauvet cave date from this period.

Typical statuettes consist of women that are called Venus figurines. They emphasize the hips, breasts, and other body parts associated with fertility. Feet and arms are lacking or minimized. One of the most ancient figurines is the Venus of Hohle Fels, discovered in 2008 in the Hohle Fels cave in Germany. The figurine has been dated to 35,000 years ago and is the earliest known, undisputed example of a depiction of a human being in prehistoric art. The Lion-man of Hohlenstein-Stadel, found in the Hohlenstein-Stadel cave of Germany's Swabian Alb and dated to 40,000 years ago, is the oldest known anthropomorphic animal figurine in the world.

Aurignacian finds include bone flutes. The oldest undisputed musical instrument was the Hohle Fels Flute discovered in the Hohle Fels cave in Germany's Swabian Alb in 2008. The flute is made from a vulture's wing bone perforated with five finger holes, and dates to approximately 35,000-40,000 years ago. A flute was also found at the Abri Blanchard in southwestern France.

== Subsistence economy ==
The great bulk of evidence from this period suggests that large game meat made up a large part of the Early Upper Paleolithic diet, although humans probably did have a more diverse diet overall than Neanderthals, having more plants, fish, and birds as well. Great climatic fluctuations probably also affected these percentages on a local level, and subsistence patterns certainly were not uniform. One area might have a greater emphasis on larger game, while another, Northern Spain for example, shows a fairly diverse amount of species hunted from a fairly diverse array of habitats, including "red and roe deer, boar, horse, bovids, ibex, and chamois".

Settlement practices were similarly very diverse and highly dependent on local conditions. As for trade, evidence suggests both an increase in the mobility and range of groups as well as an increase in inter-group exchange. According to cited text "Sites in Lower Austria, such as Krems-Hundsteig, contain shells from either the Mediterranean, about 300 kilometers away today, or the Black Sea, approximately 600 kilometers away (Hahn 1971). Small amounts of stone or fossils in Aurignacian sites of Moravia, southern Germany and the Rhineland can be traced to sources from 50 to over 200 kilometers away (Hahn 1987, Svoboda et al.1996). "

=== Gallery ===
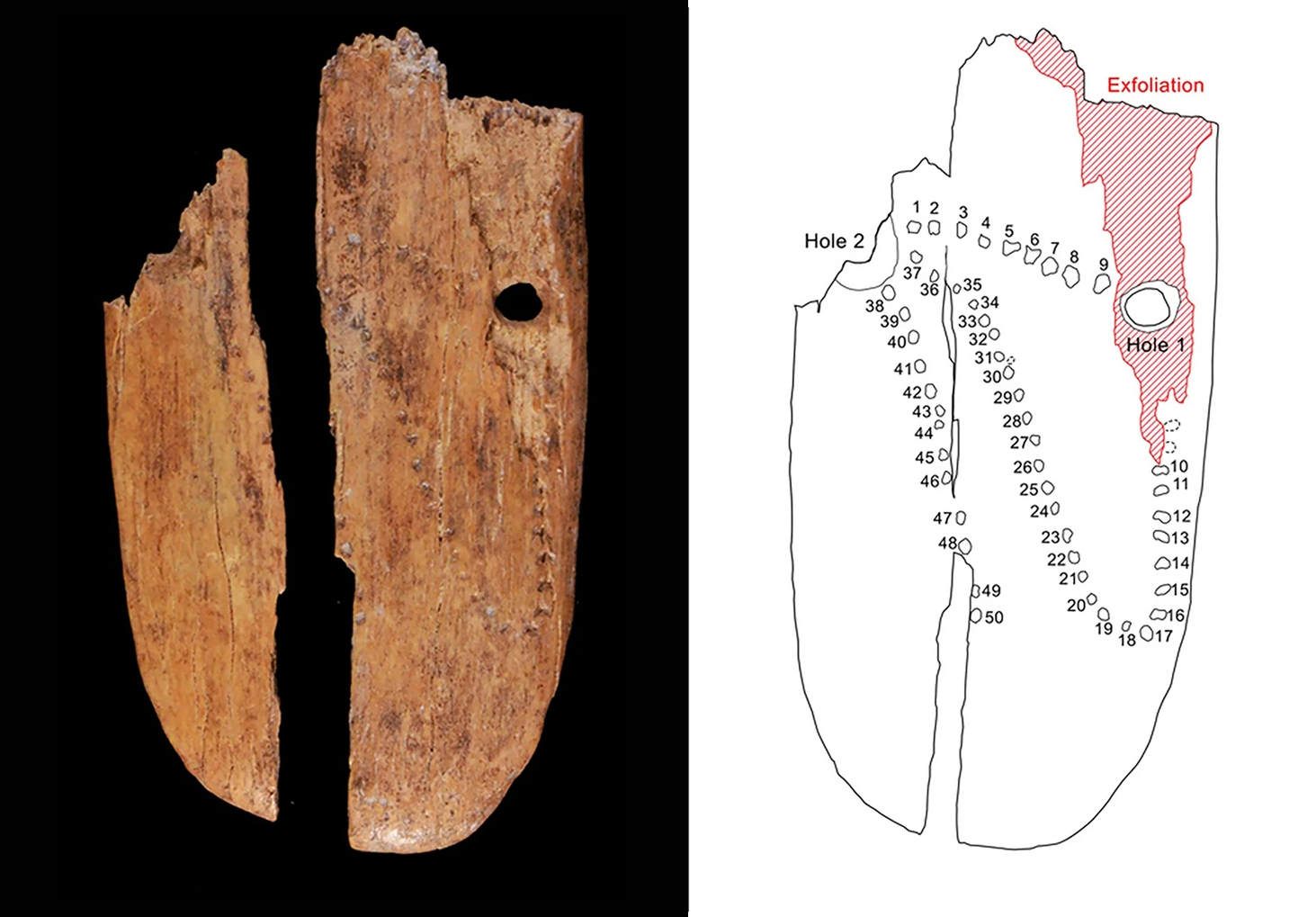
Decorated ivory pendant from Stajnia Cave, Poland, c. 41,500 BP

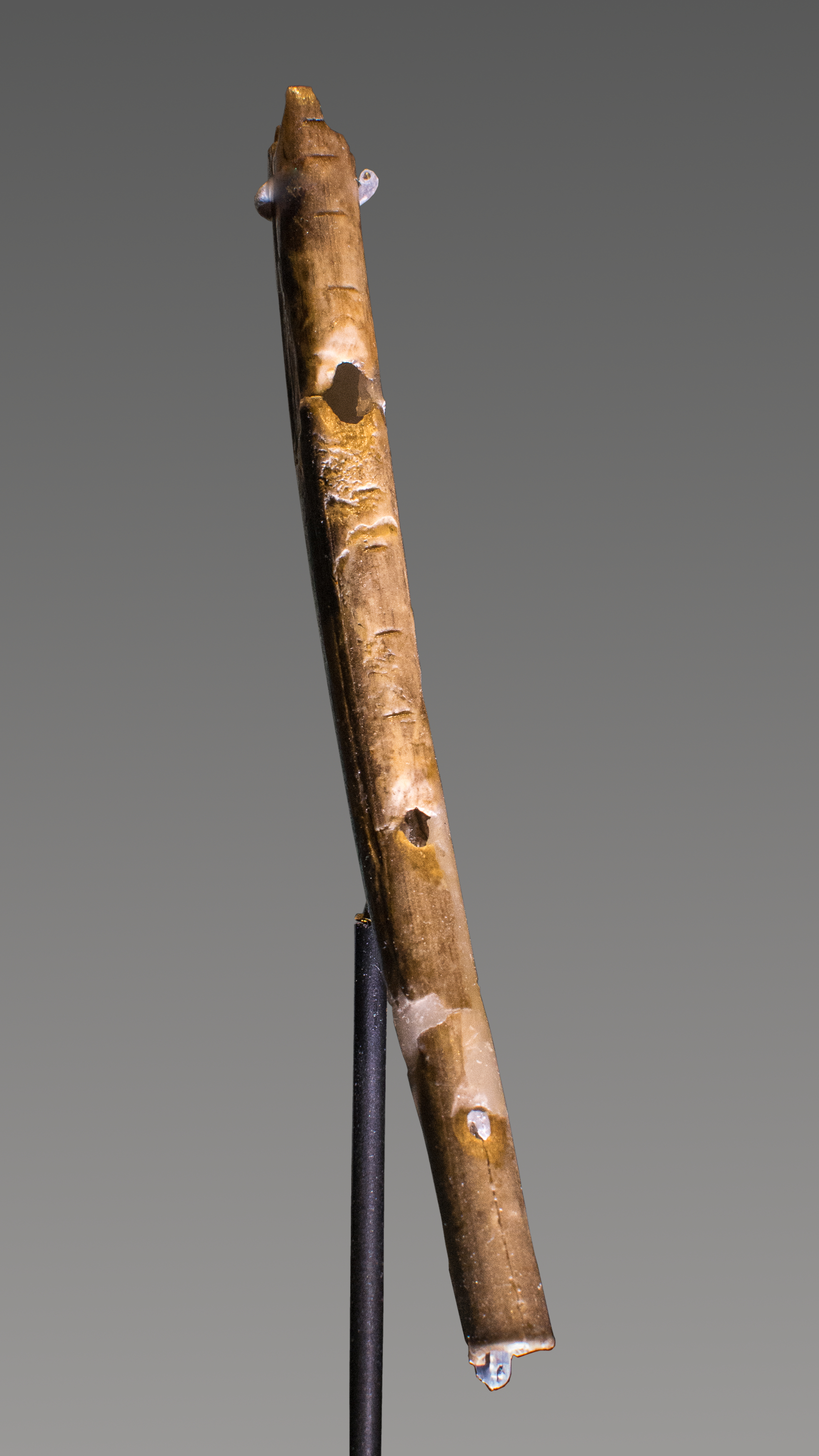
Bone flute, 35,000-40,000 years old

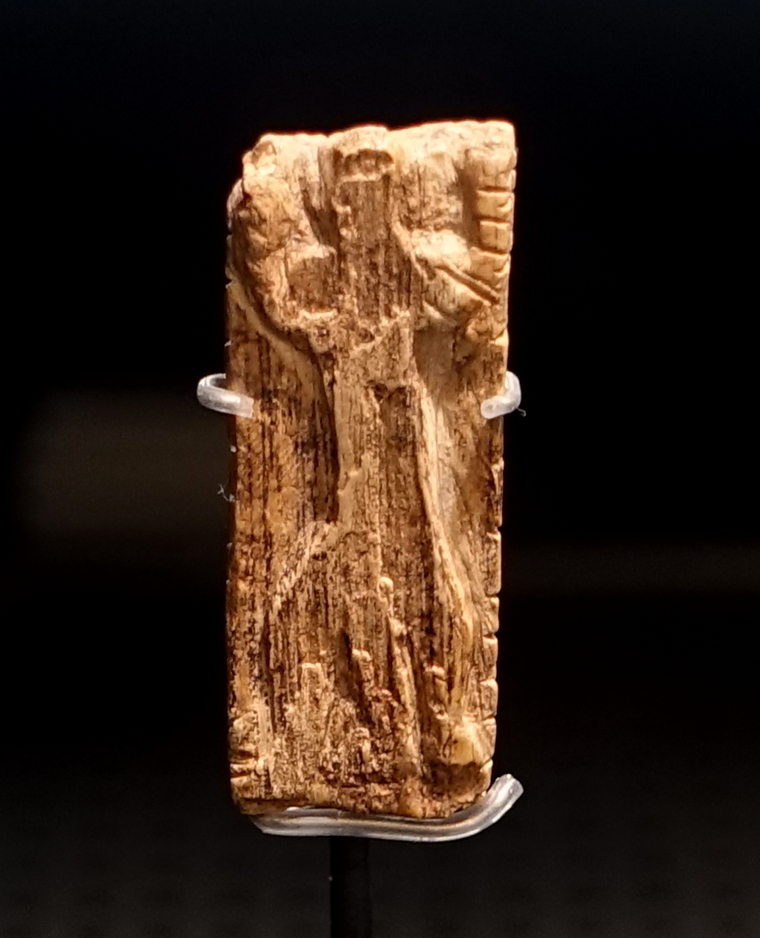
The Adorant of Geissenklösterle, Germany

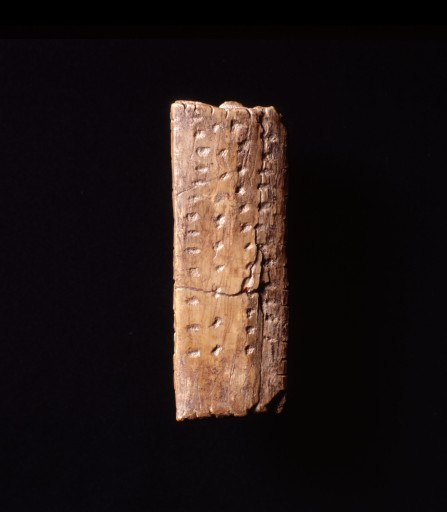
The Adorant of Geissenklösterle, reverse side with notches

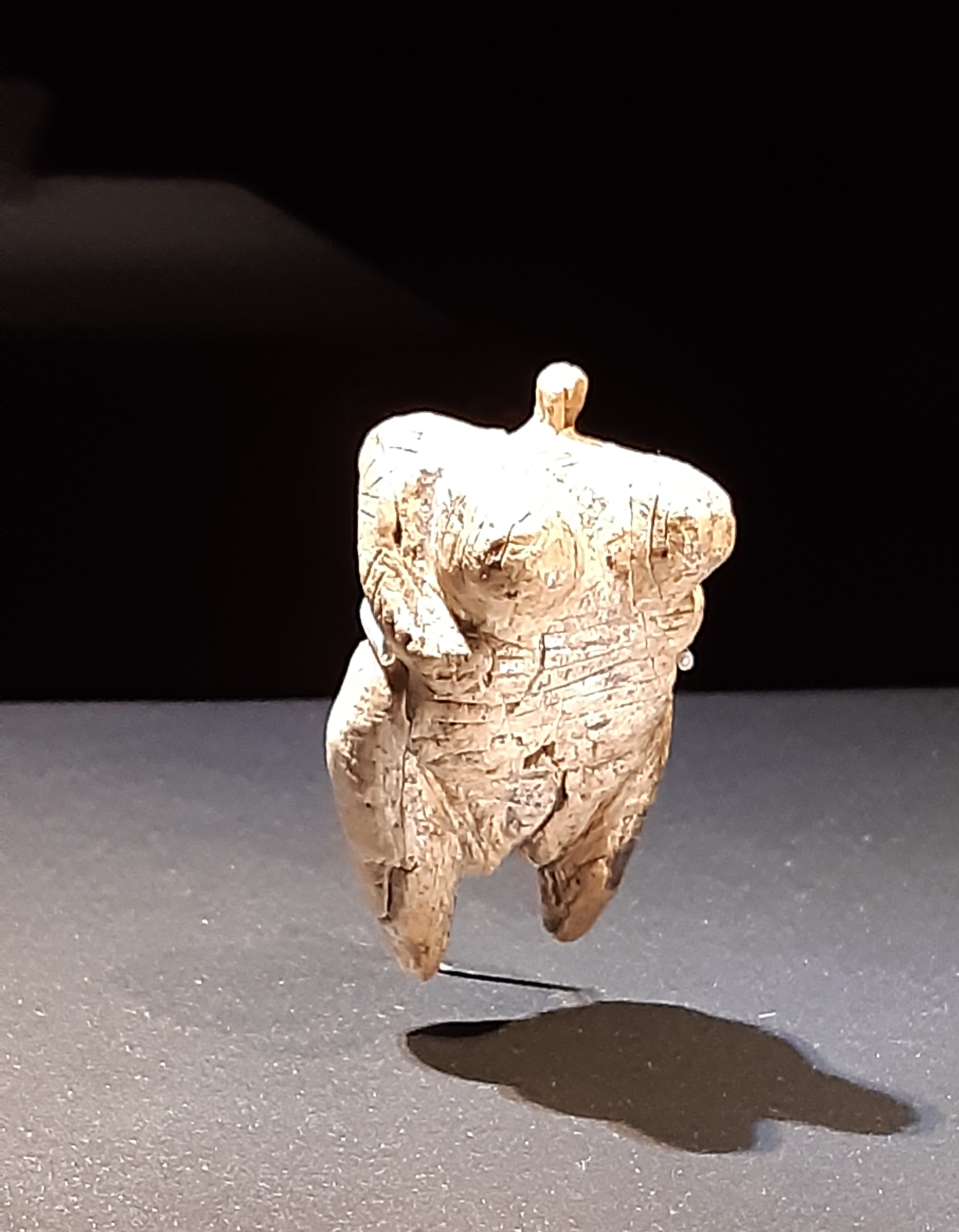
The Venus of Hohle Fels figurine (height 6 cm), 35,000 BP

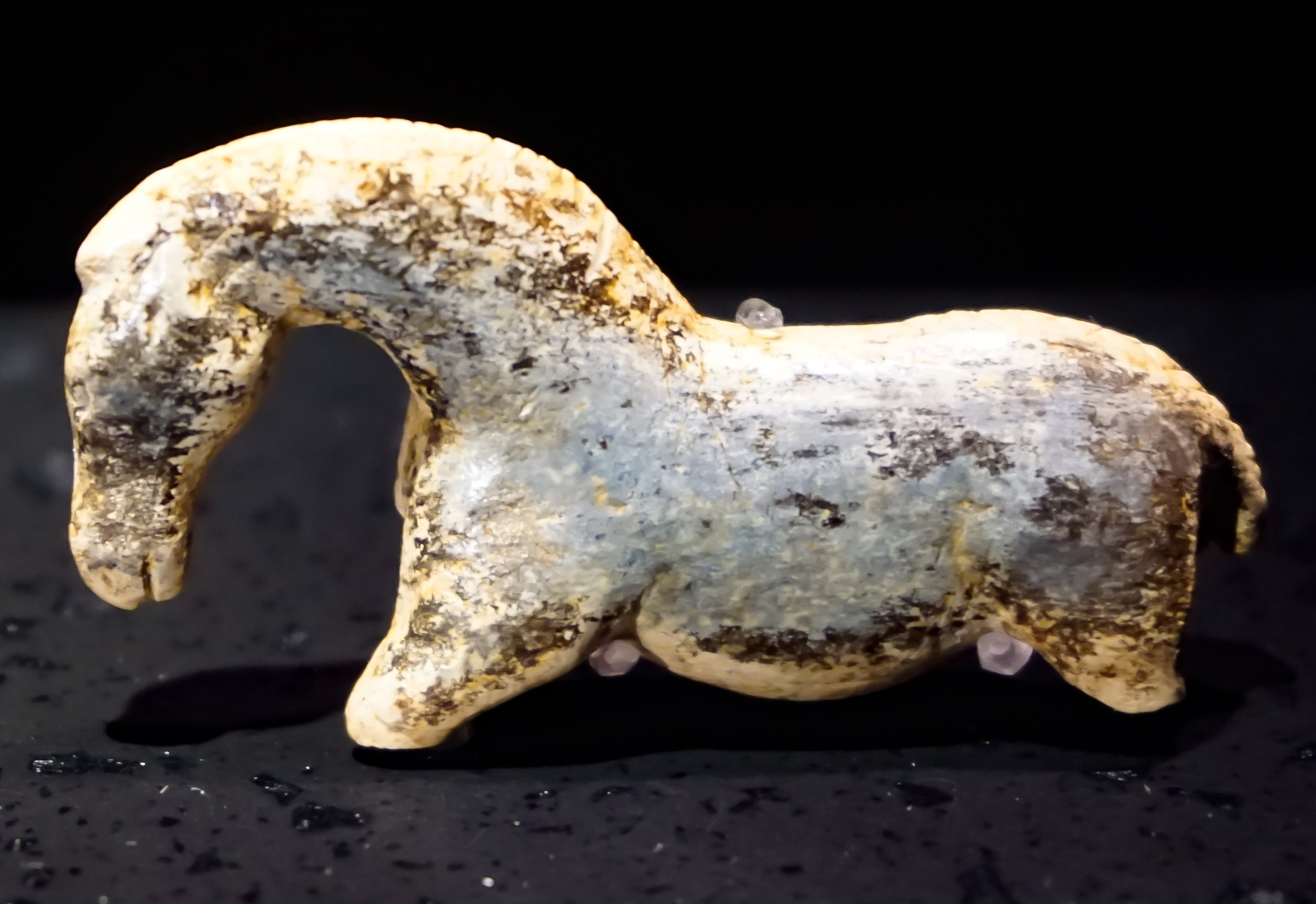
Horse figurine from Vogelherd Cave, Germany

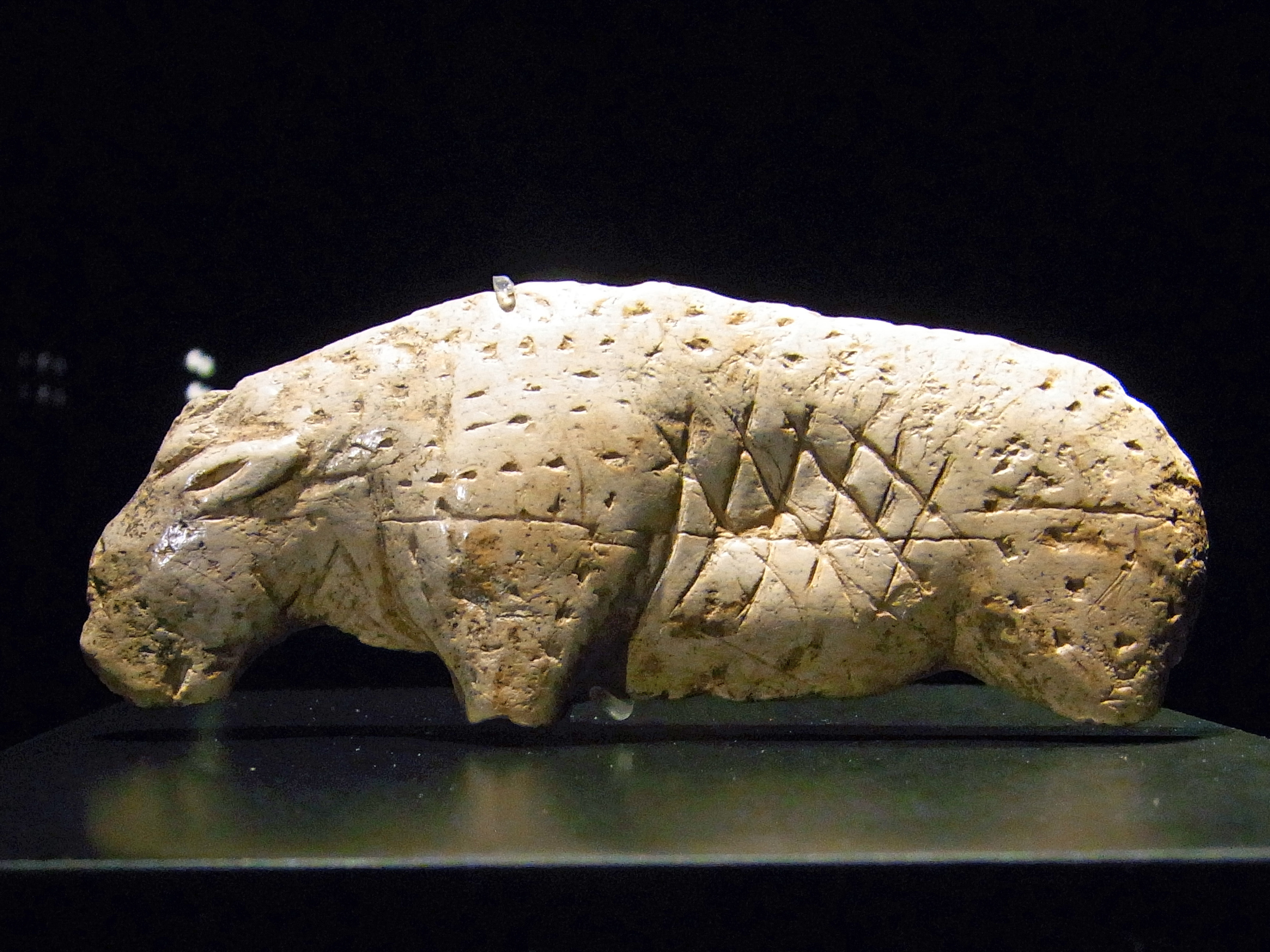
Animal figurine from Vogelherd Cave

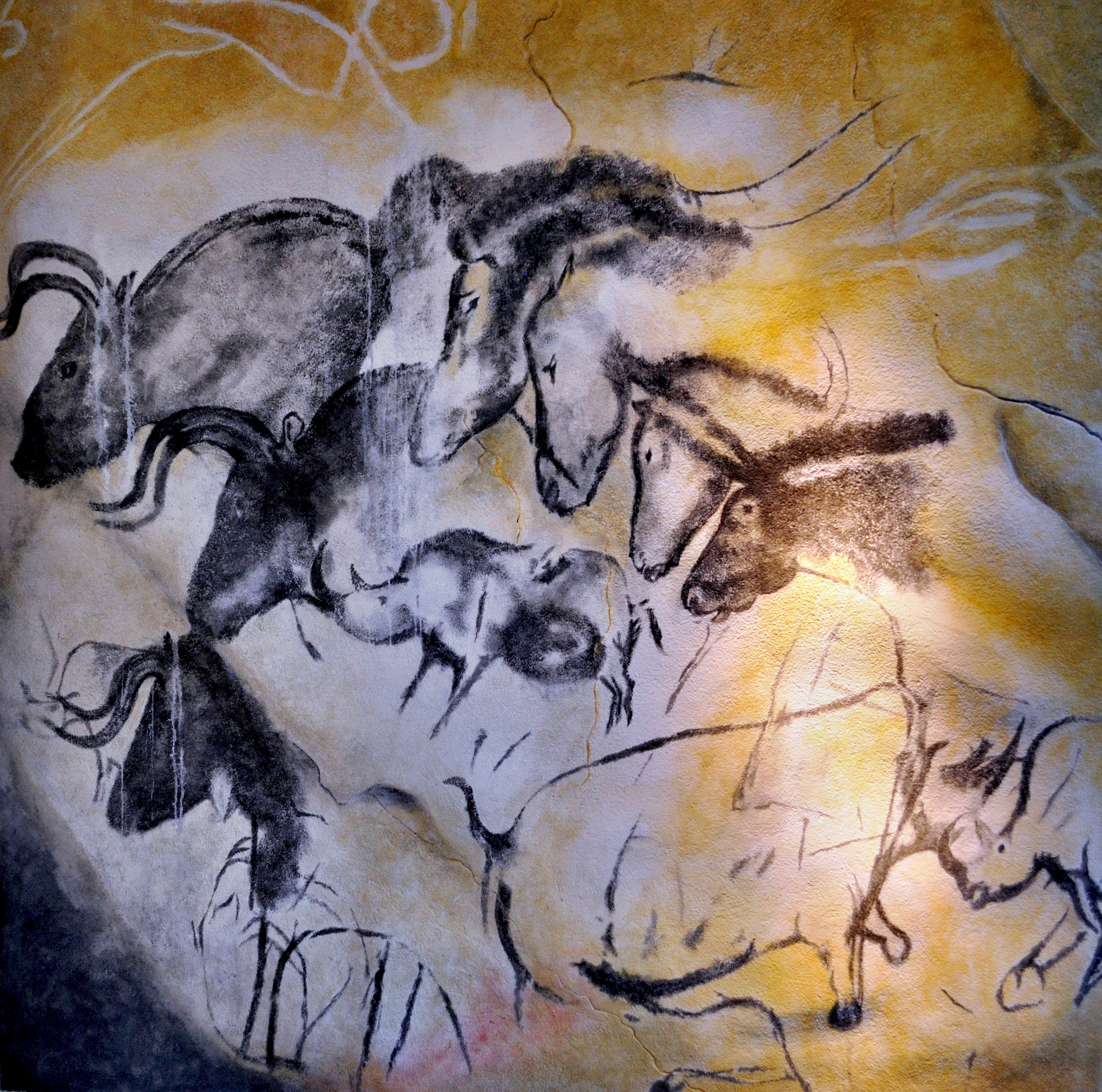
Chauvet Cave painting, France

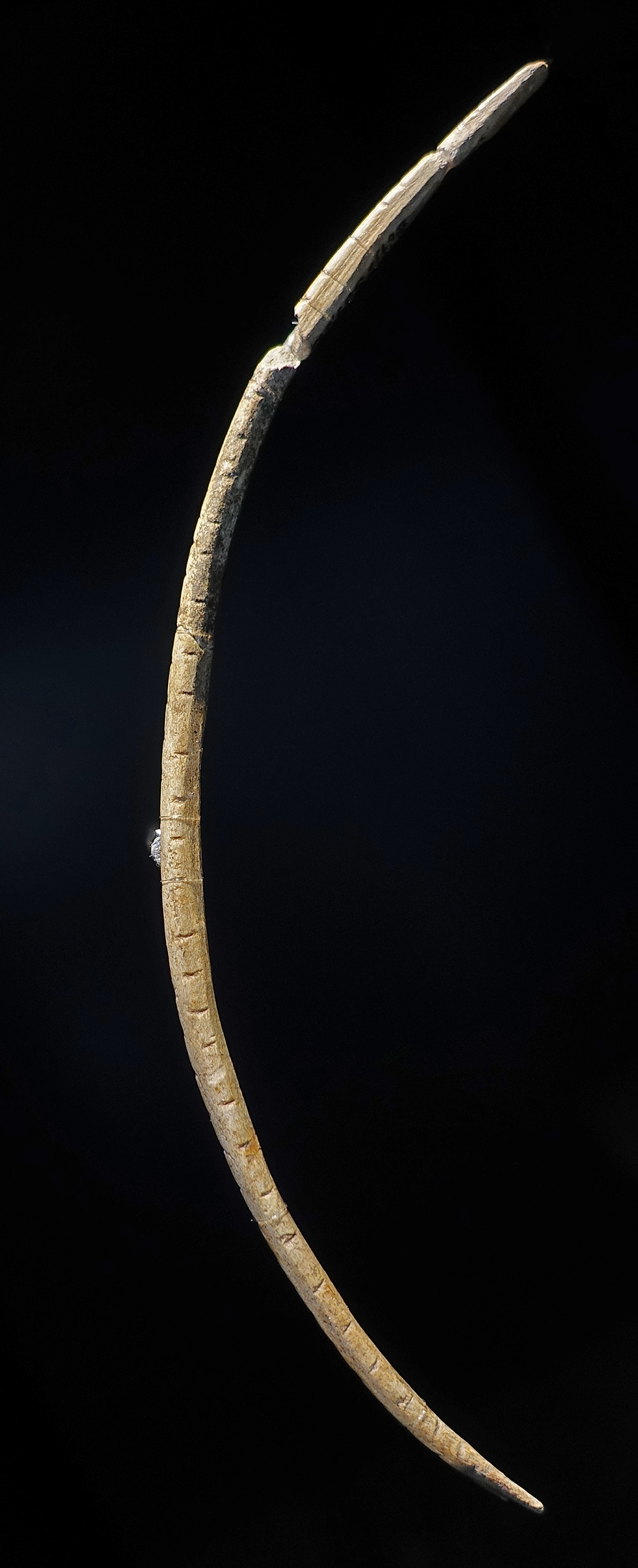
Possible musical bow from Geisenklösterle, Germany

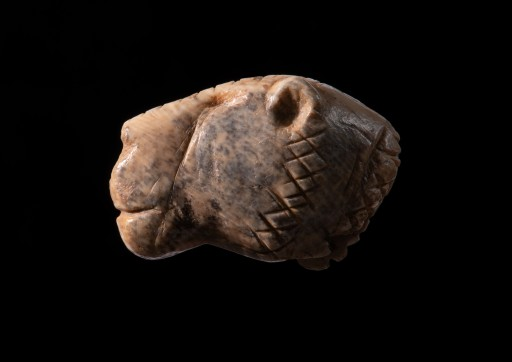
Lion head sculpture, Vogelherd cave

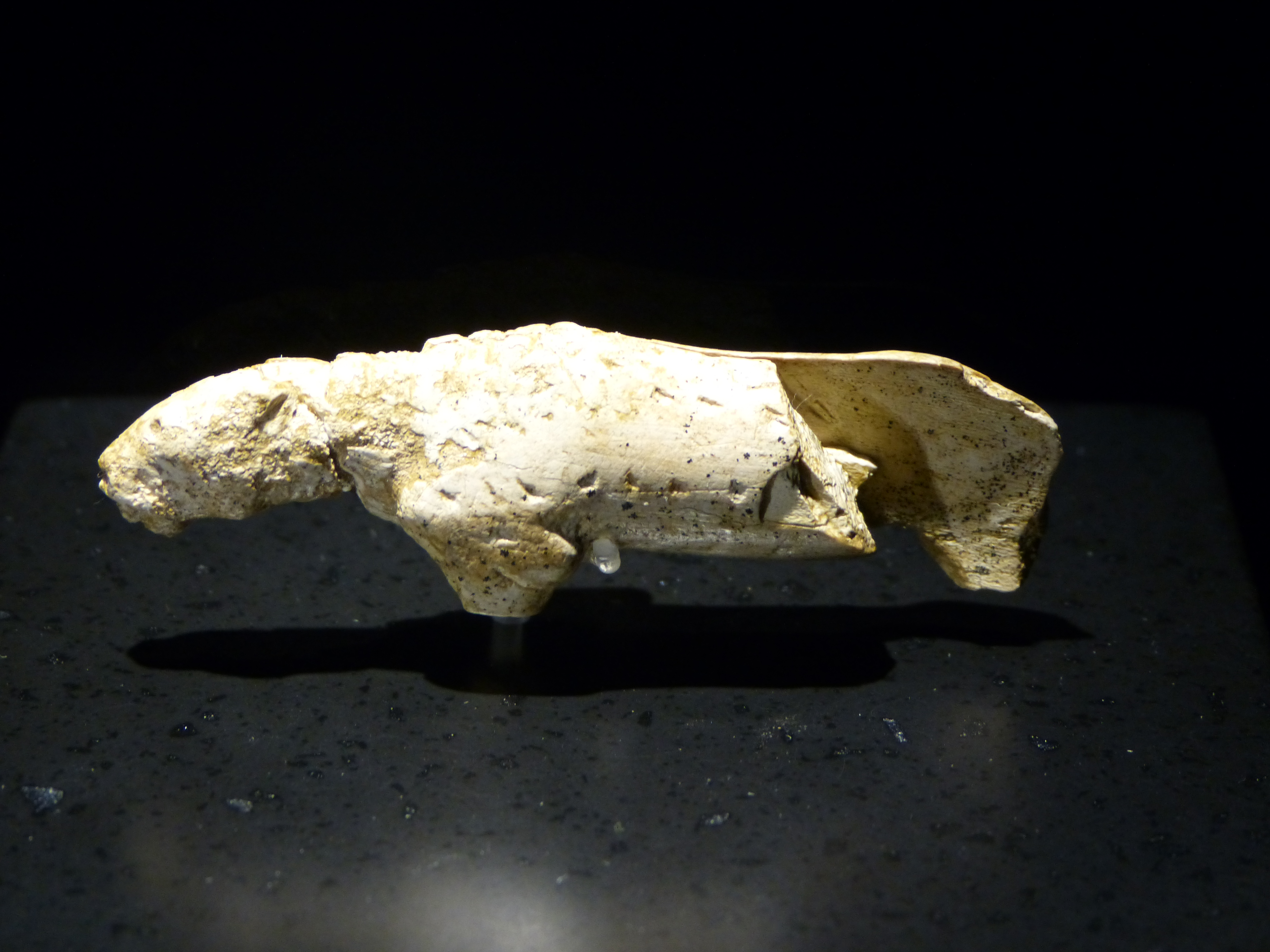
Lion sculpture, Vogelherd cave

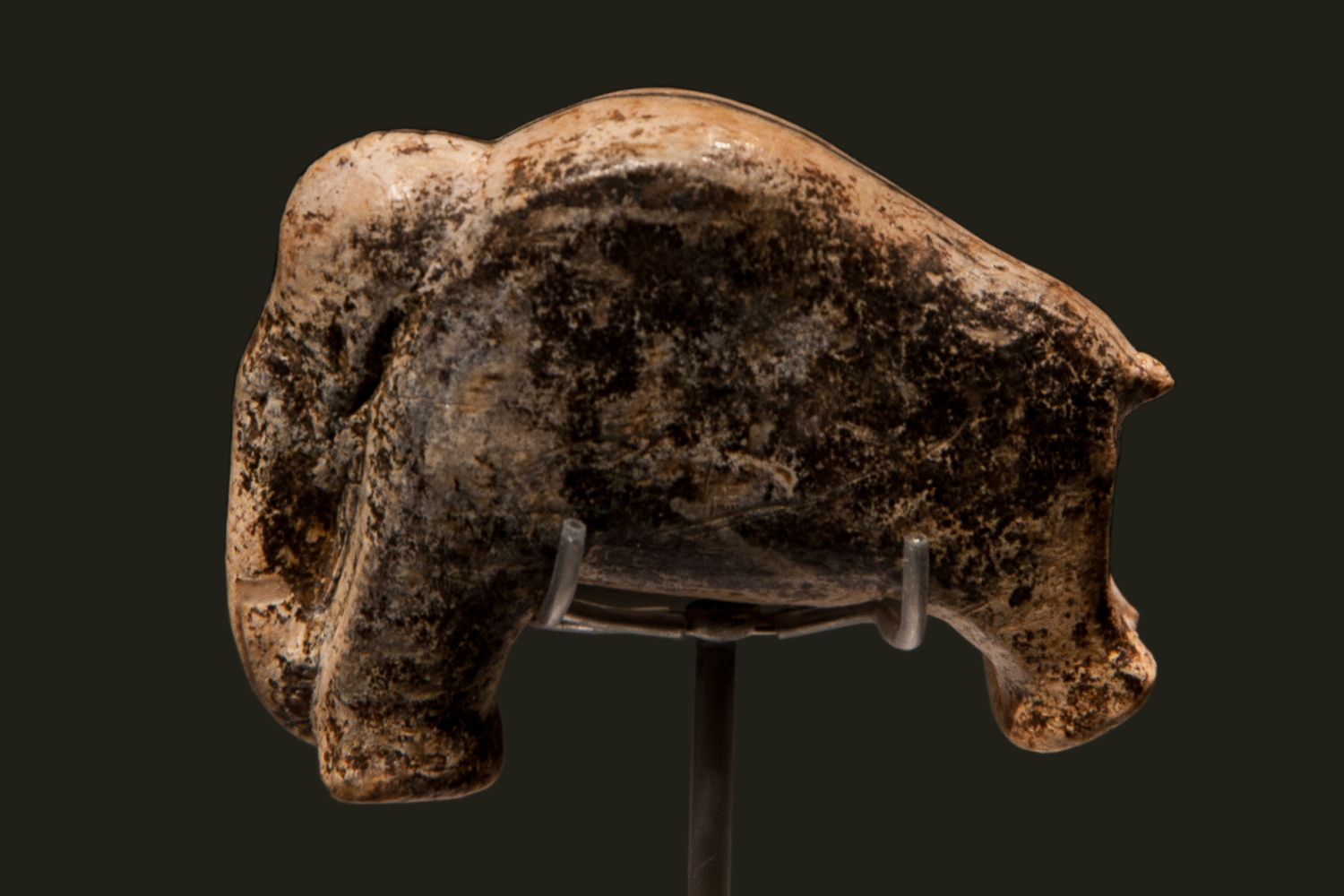
Mammoth sculpture, Vogelherd cave

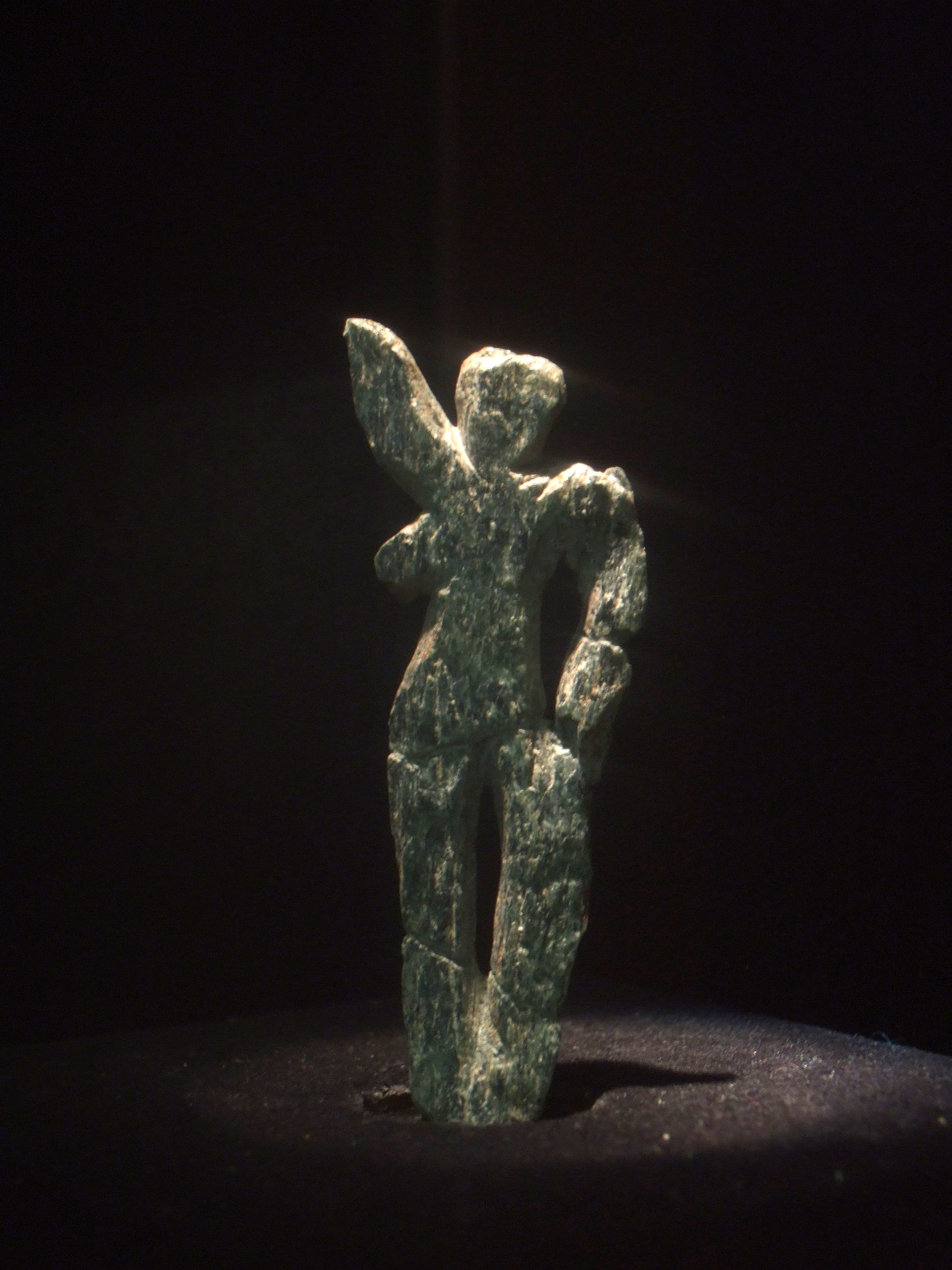
Venus of Galgenberg, Austria

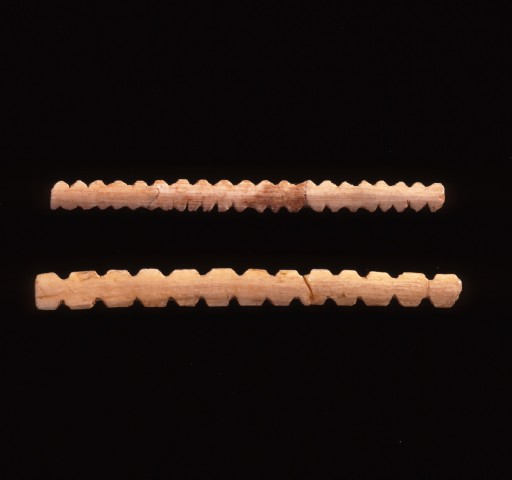
Carved ivory from Brillenhöhle cave

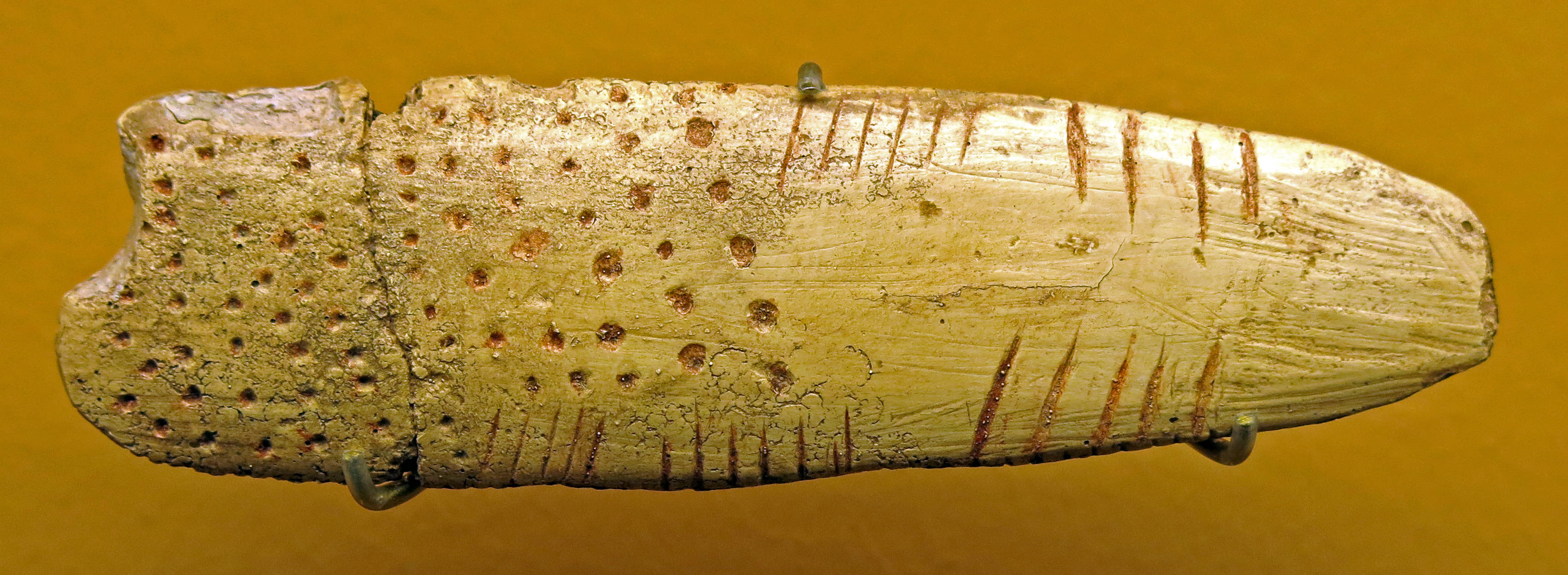
Engraved plaque from Abri Lartet, France

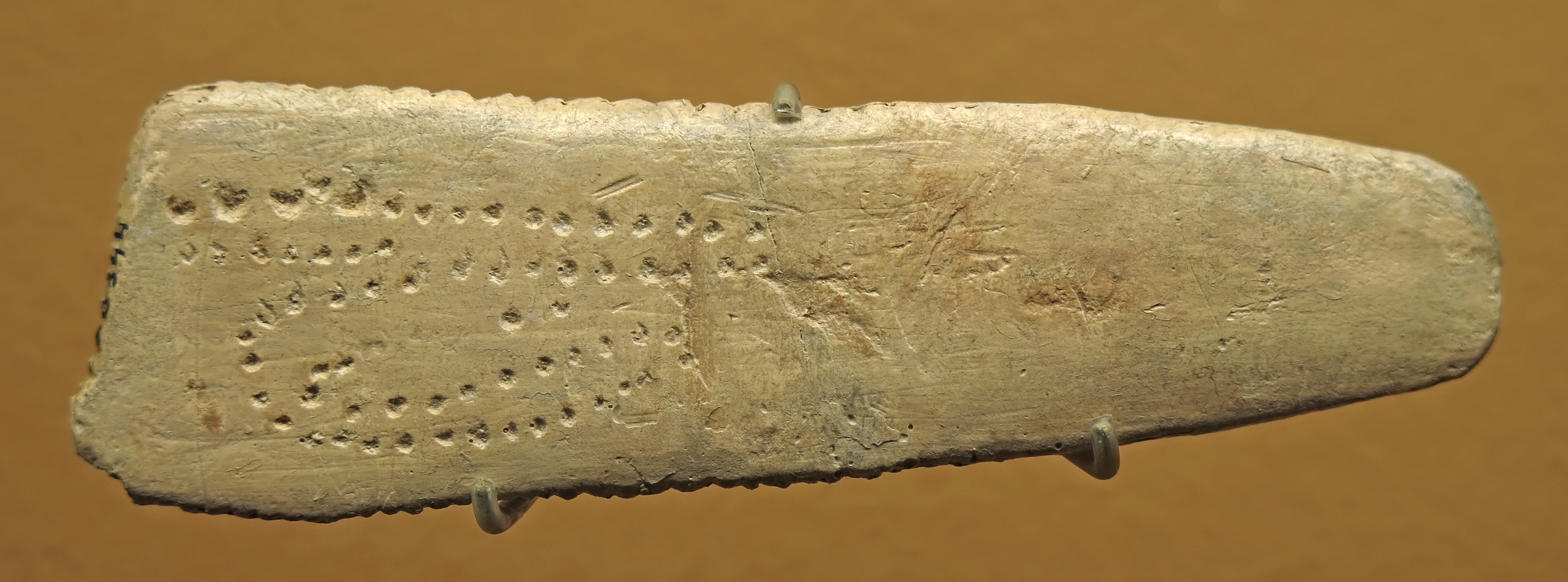
Engraved plaque from Abri Blanchard, France

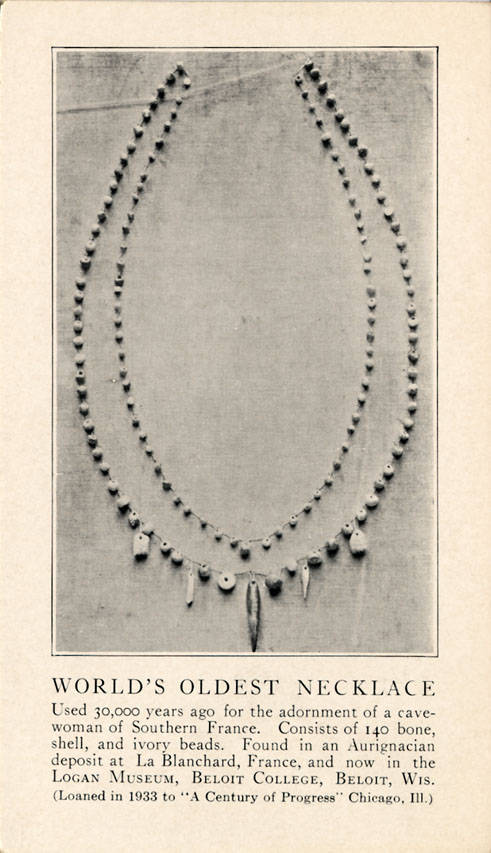
Necklace from Castel Merle, France

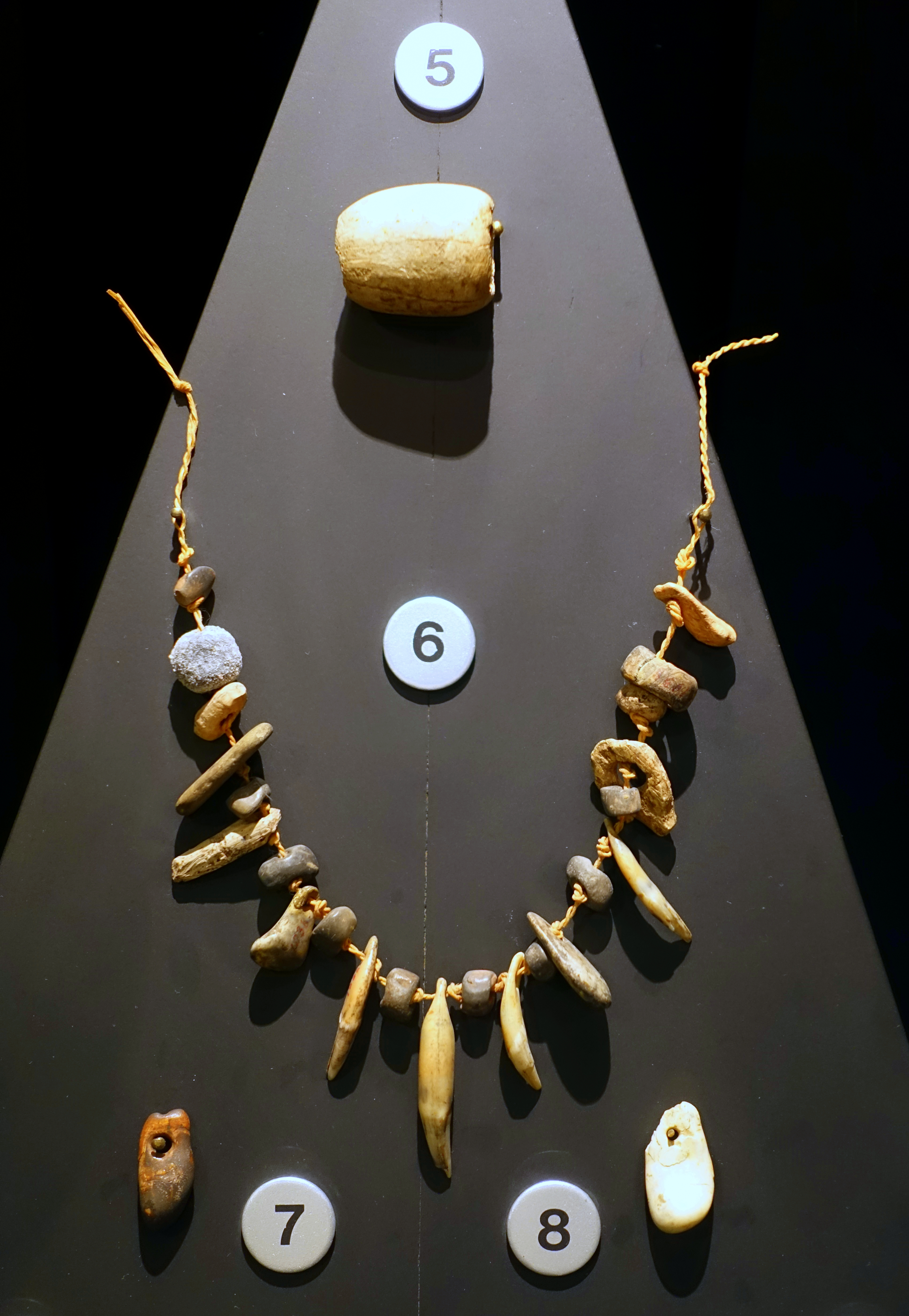
Aurignacian jewellery, Belgium

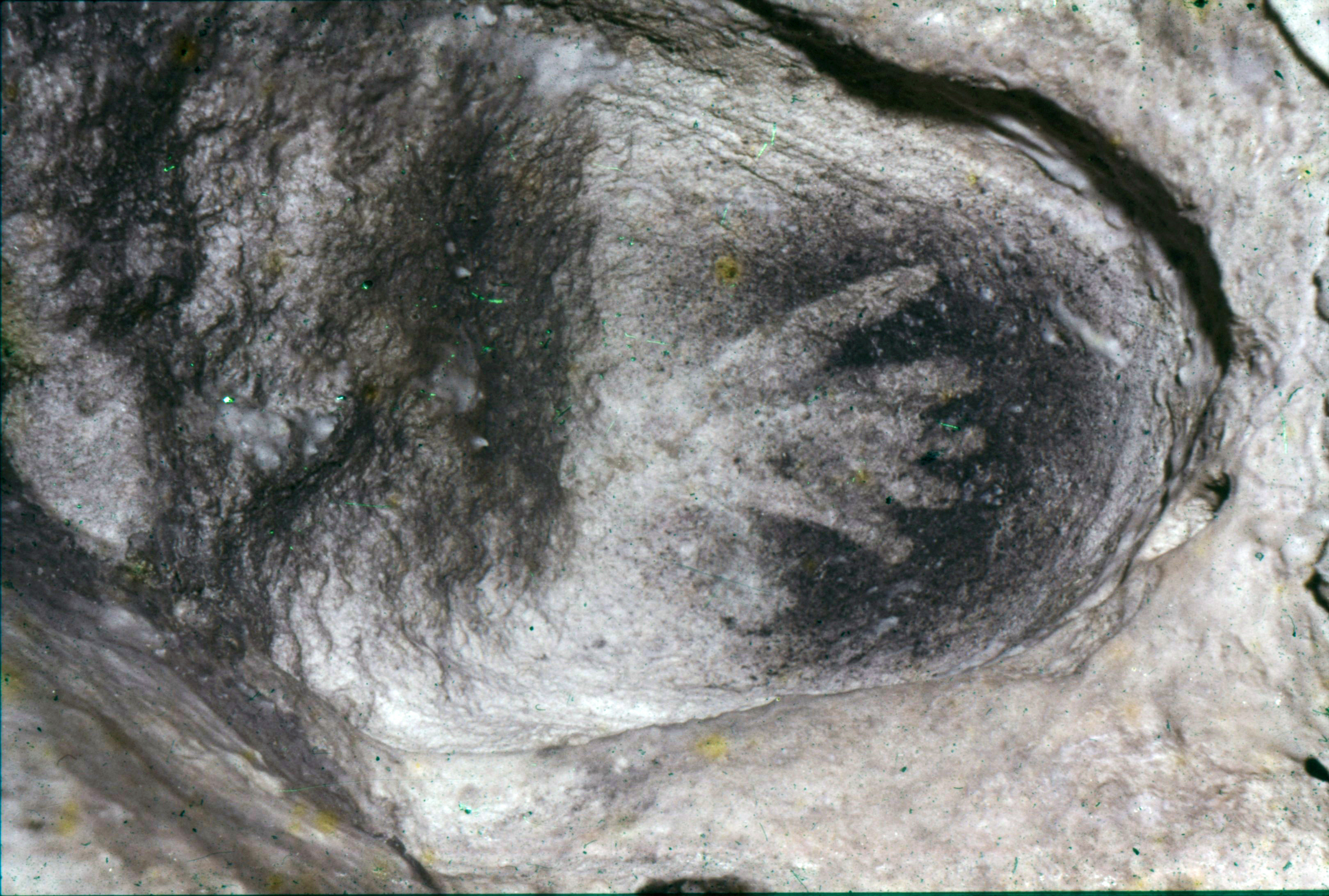
A painting of a hand in the Cave of Aurignac, France

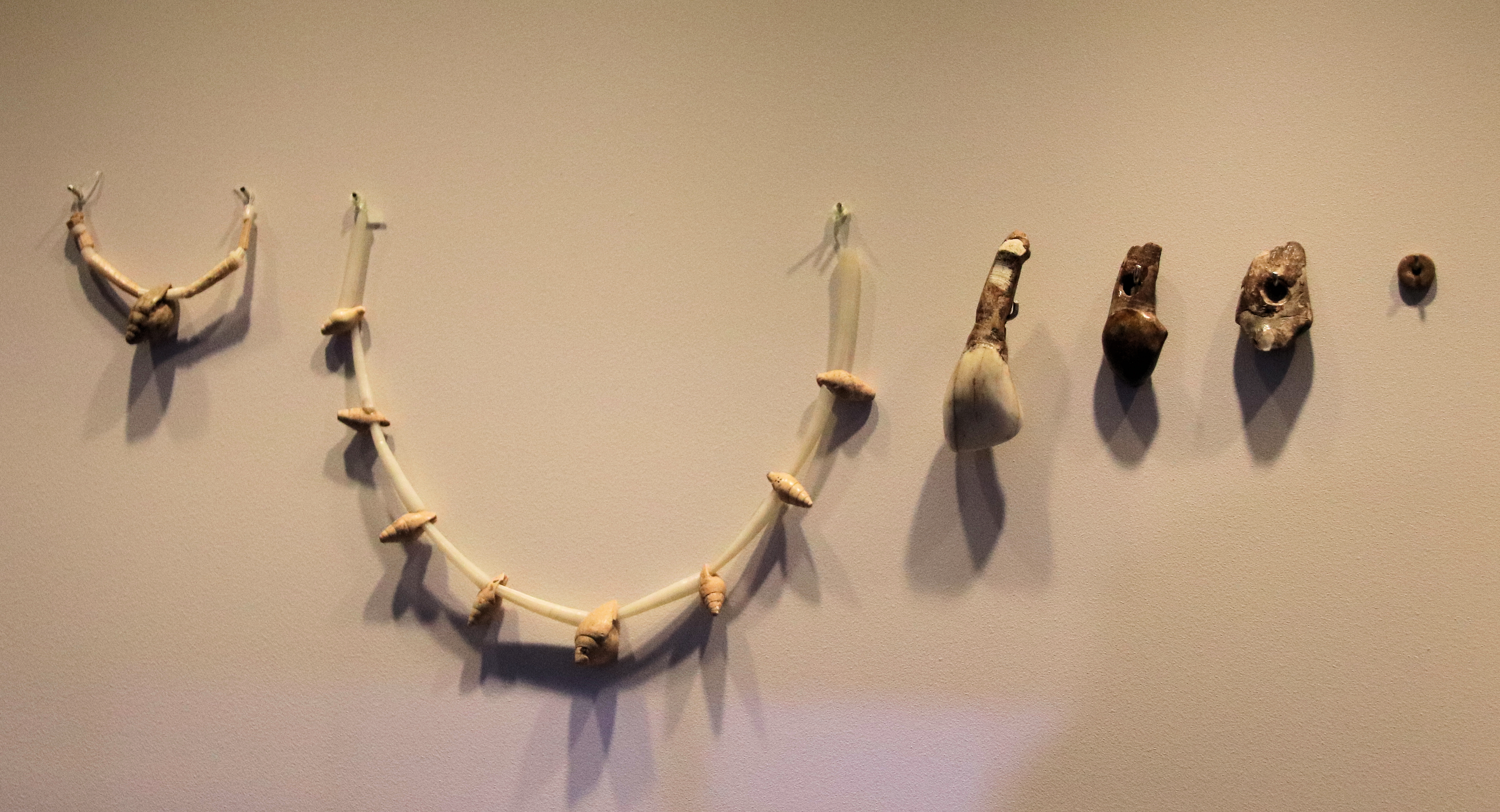
Jewelry, Fazael, Israel, Upper Paleolithic.

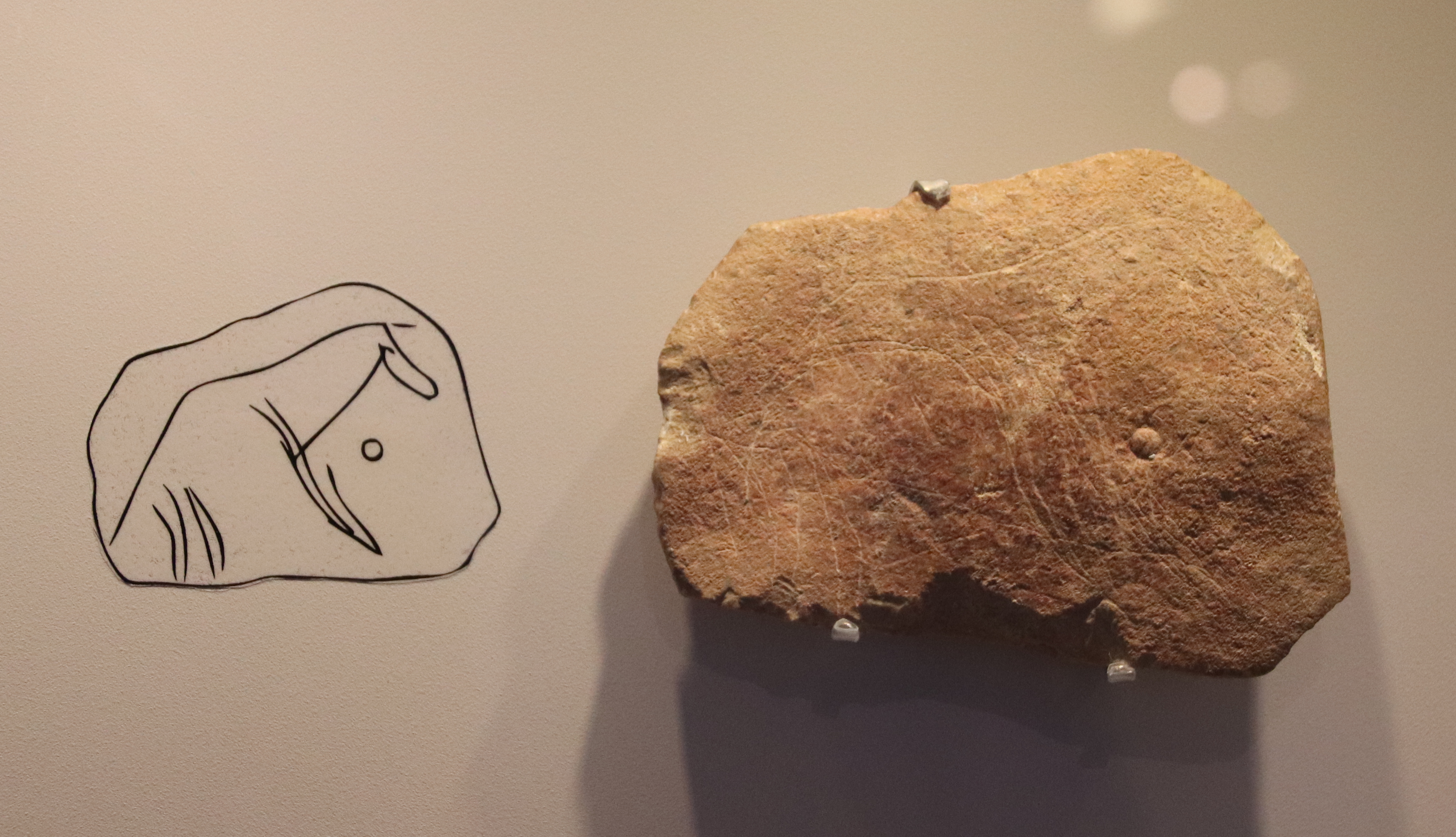
A carving of a running horse, Hayonim Cave, Levant.

== Tools ==
Stone tools from the Aurignacian culture are known as Mode 4, characterized by blades (rather than flakes, typical of mode 2 Acheulean and mode 3 Mousterian) from prepared cores. Also seen throughout the Upper Paleolithic is a greater degree of tool standardization and the use of bone and antler for tools. Based on the research of scraper reduction and paleoenvironment, the early Aurignacian group moved seasonally over greater distances to procure reindeer herds within cold and open environments than those of the earlier tool cultures.

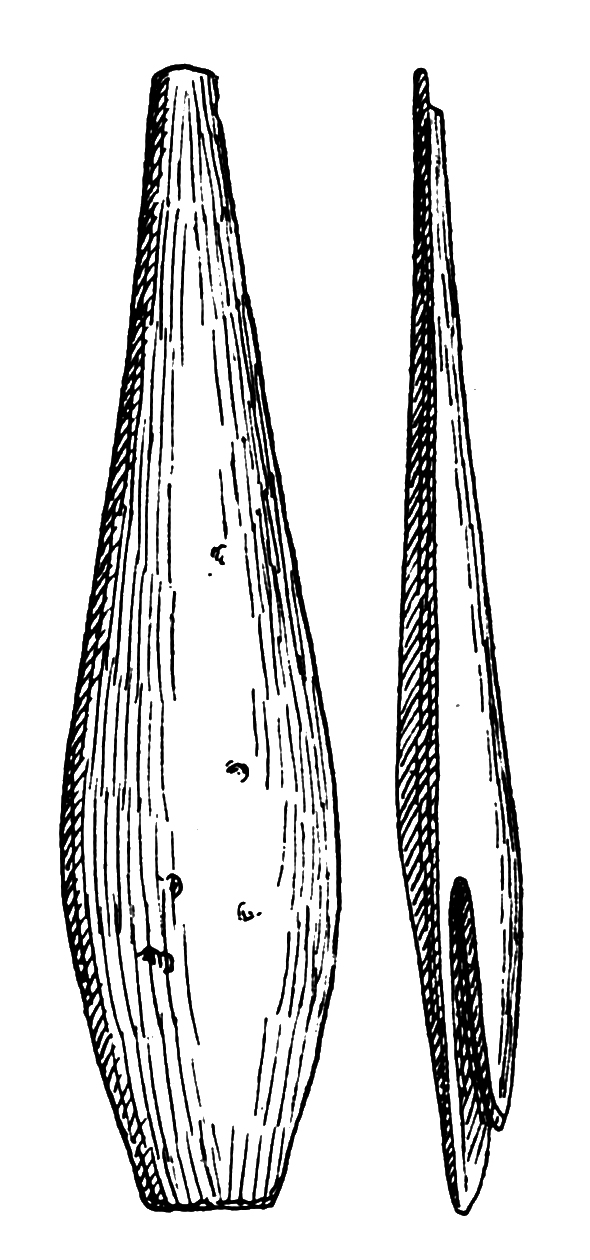
A bone point

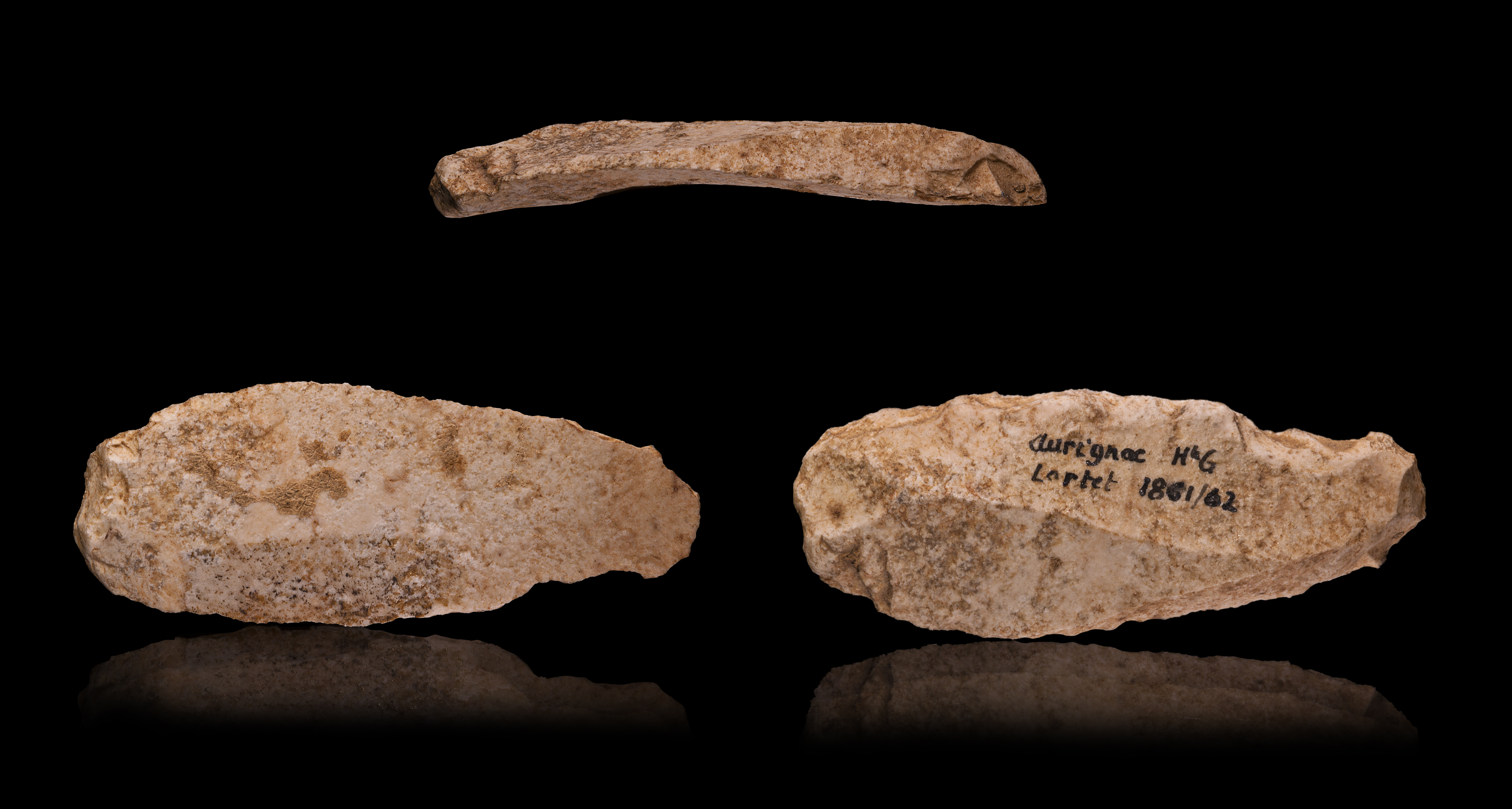
A scraper from Aurignac (France)

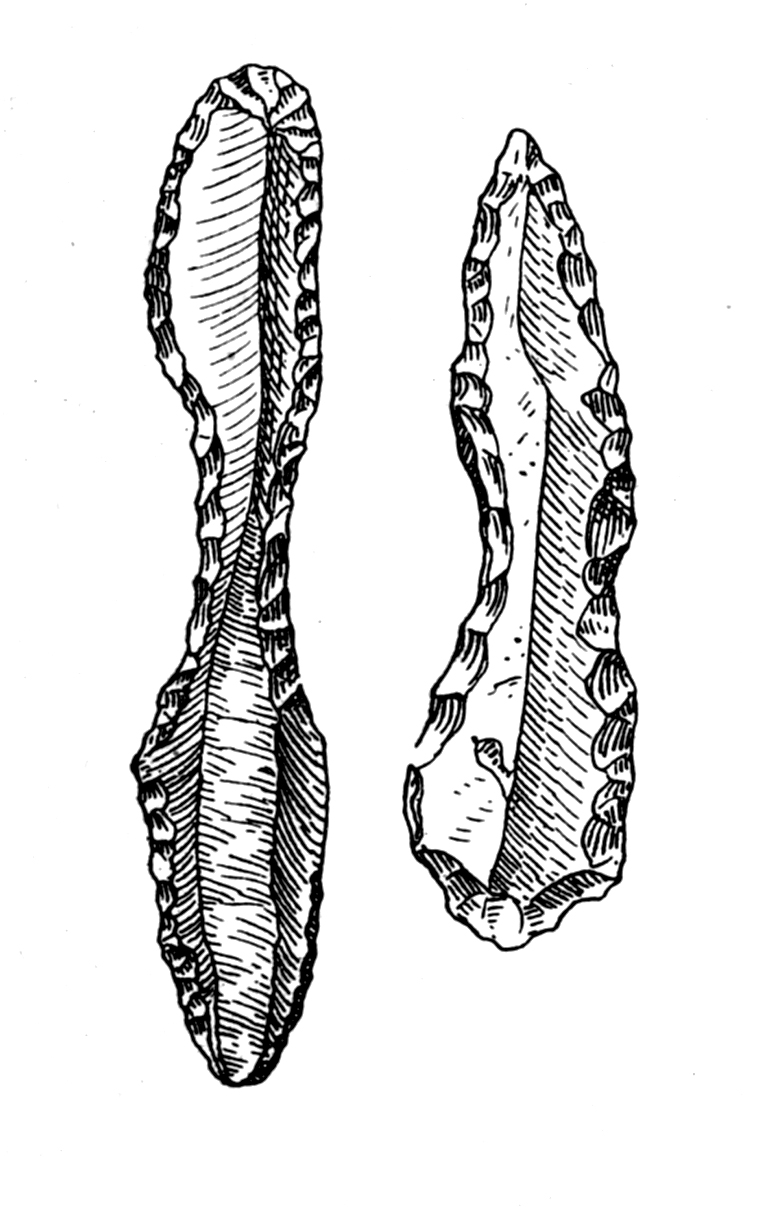
Aurignacian blades

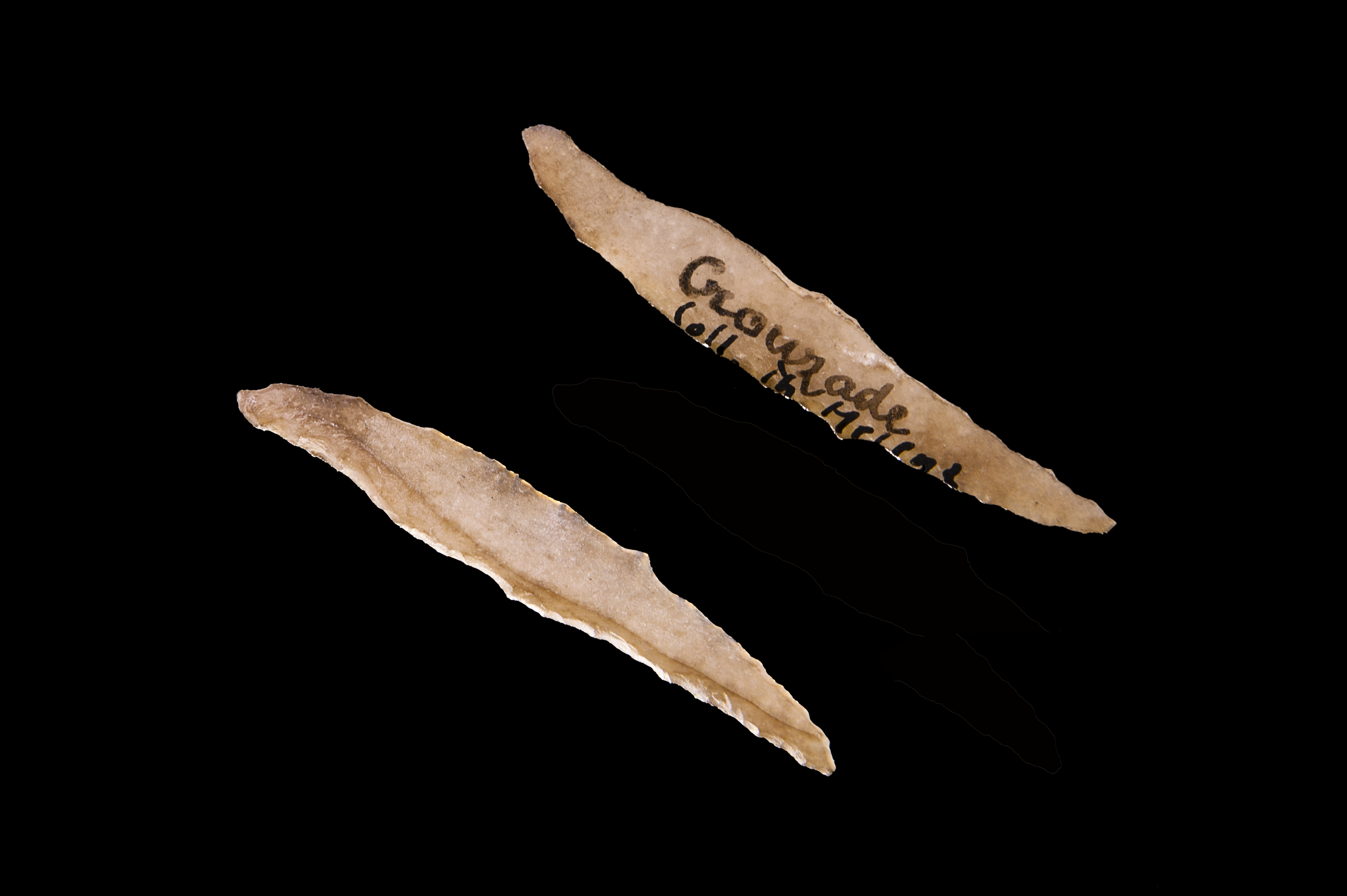
Dufour bladelet

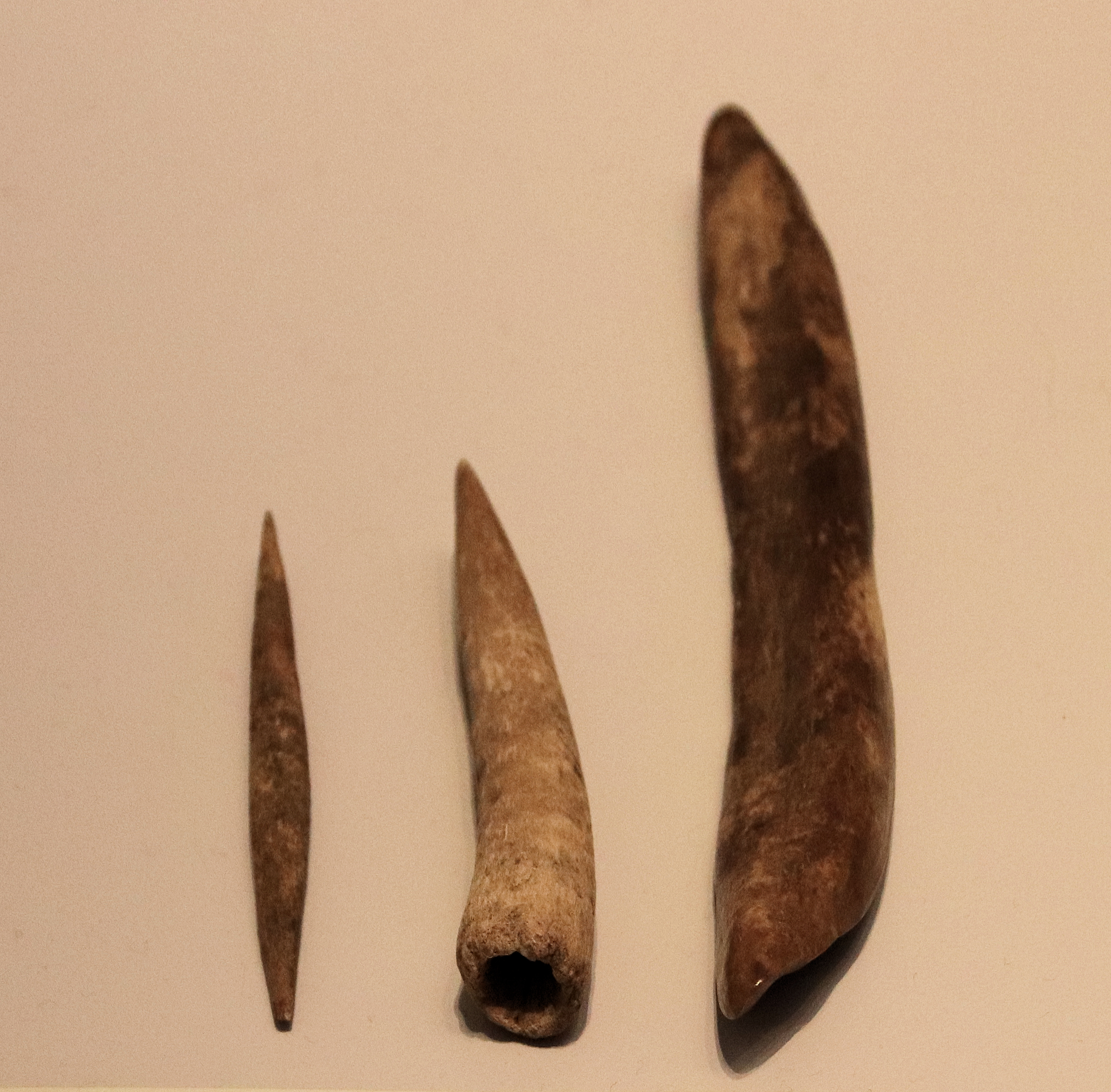
Bone tools, Hayonim Cave, 30000 BP.

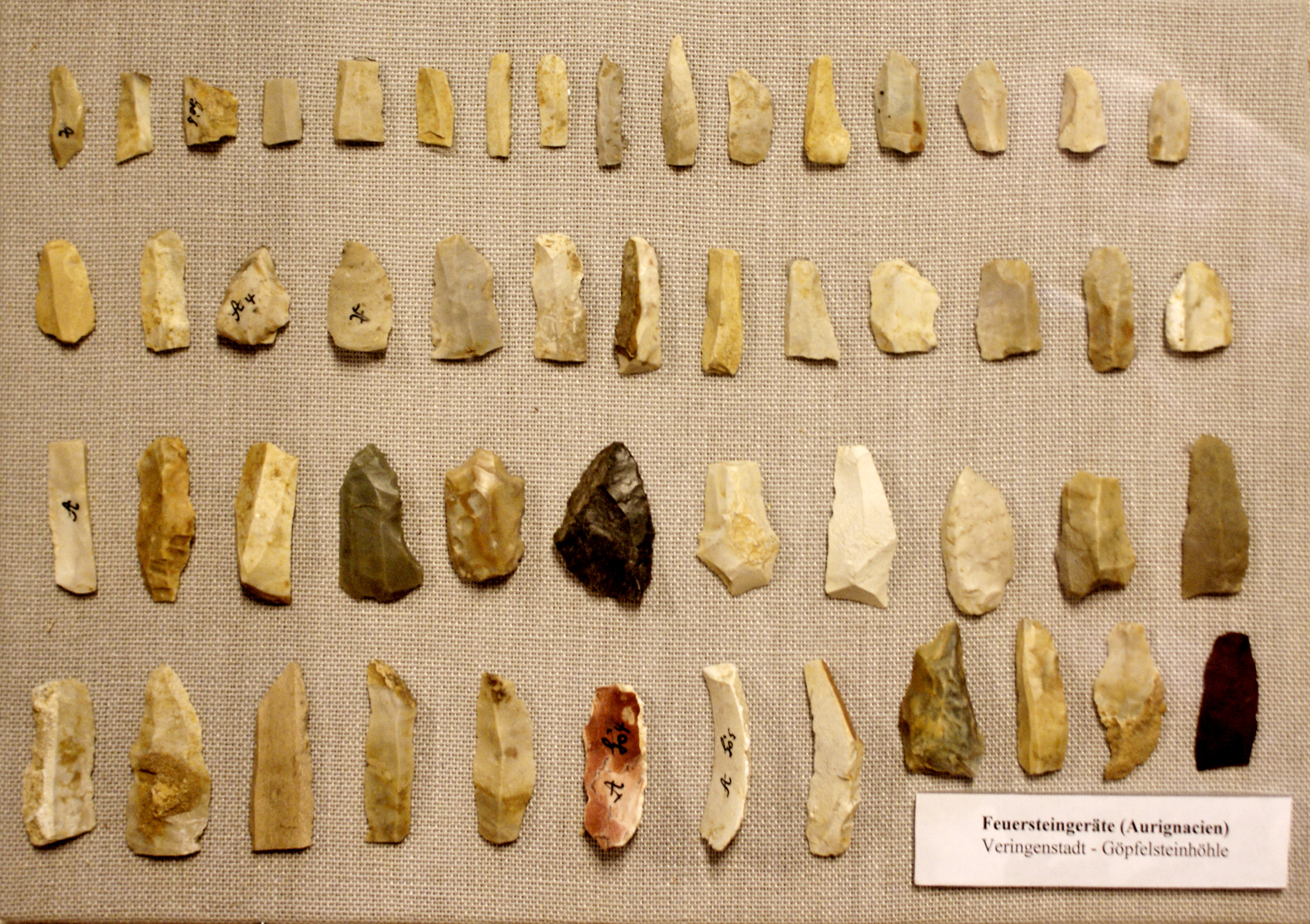
Aurignacian microliths

== Population ==
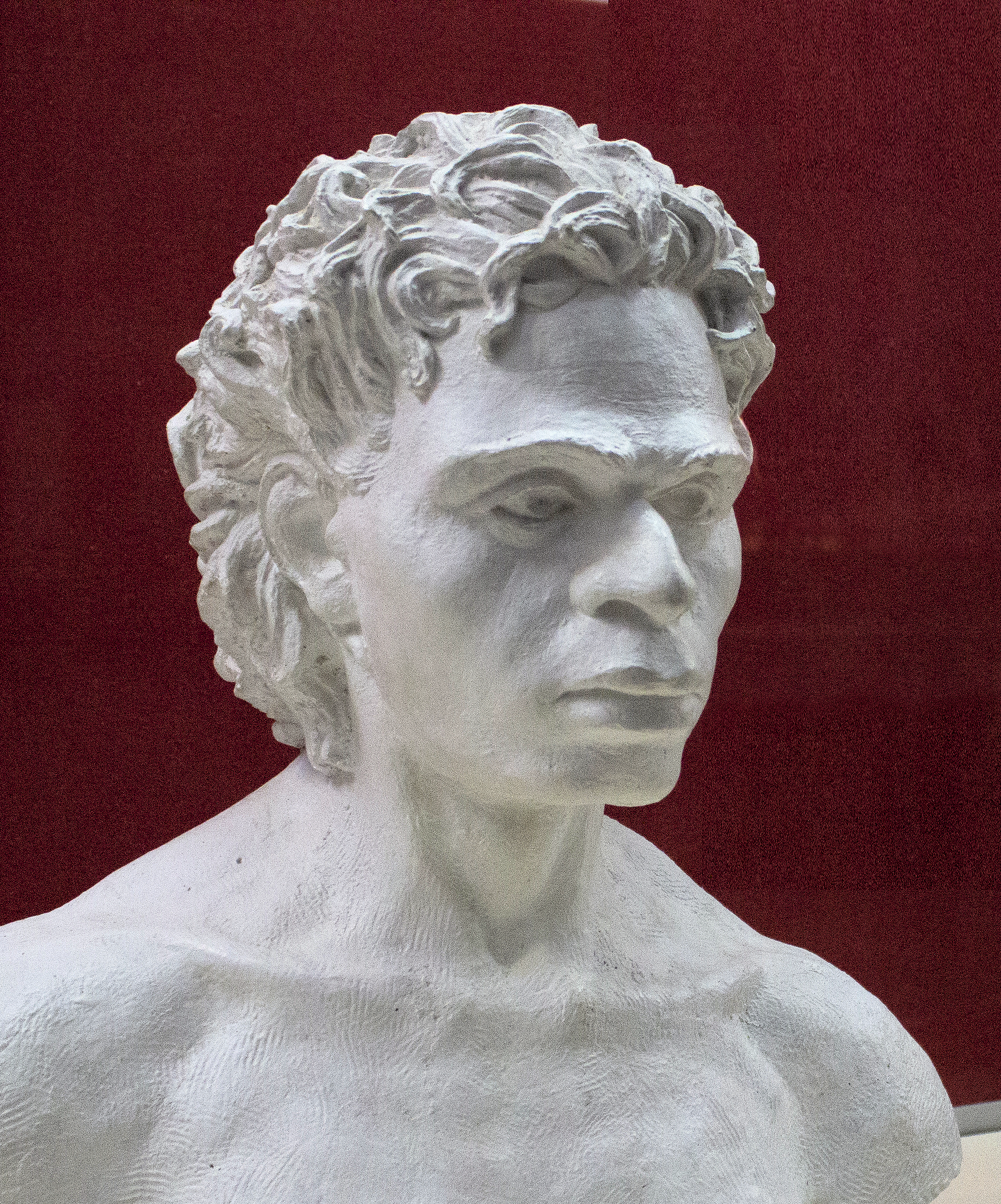
Forensic reconstruction of the Kostenki-14 modern human (38,700–36,200 year ago), considered as Aurignacian. M. M. Gerasimov, Moscow State Archaeological Museum

A 2019 demographic analysis estimated a mean population of 1,500 persons (upper limit: 3,300; lower limit: 800) for western and central Europe during the Aurignacian period (~42,000 to 33,000 y cal BP).

A 2005 study estimated the population of Upper Palaeolithic Europe from 40 to 30 thousand years ago was 1,738–28,359 (average 4,424).

== Association with modern humans ==
The sophistication and self-awareness demonstrated in the work led archaeologists to consider the makers of Aurignacian artifacts the first modern humans in Europe. Human remains and Late Aurignacian artifacts found in juxtaposition support this inference. Although finds of human skeletal remains in direct association with Proto-Aurignacian technologies are scarce in Europe, the few available are also probably modern human. The best dated association between Aurignacian industries and human remains are those of at least five individuals from the Mladeč caves in the Czech Republic, dated by direct radiocarbon measurements of the skeletal remains to at least 31,000–32,000 years old.

At least three robust, but typically anatomically modern, individuals from the Peștera cu Oase cave in Romania, were dated directly from the bones to ca. 35,000–36,000 BP. Although not associated directly with archaeological material, these finds are within the chronological and geographical range of the Early Aurignacian in southeastern Europe. On genetic evidence it has been argued that both Aurignacian and the Dabba culture of North Africa came from an earlier big game hunting Levantine Aurignacian culture of the Levant.

== Genetics ==
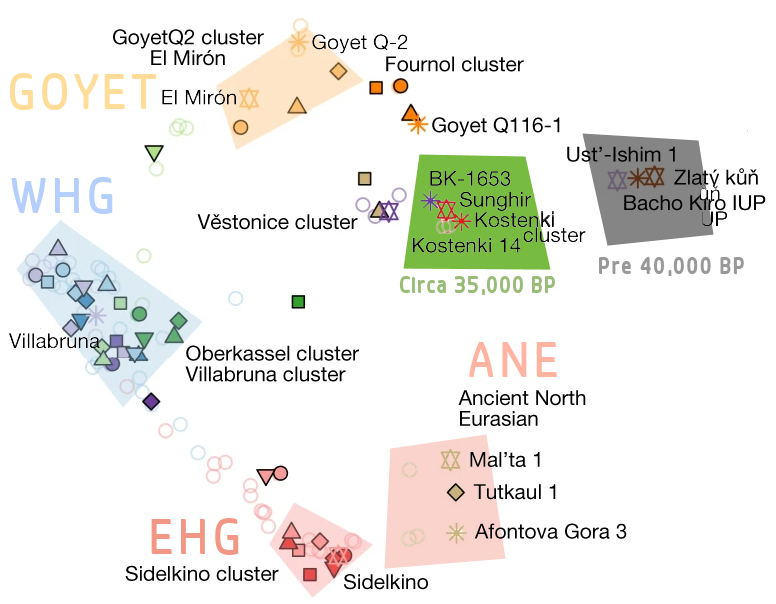
Genetic position of the Goyet cluster, corresponding to the Aurignacian, in relation to other hunter-gatherers

In a genetic study published in Nature in May 2016, the remains of an early Aurignacian individual, Goyet Q116-1 from modern-day Belgium, were examined. He belonged to the paternal haplogroup C1a and the maternal haplogroup M. Haplogroups identified in other Aurignacian samples are the paternal haplogroups C1b and K2a; (Note: Kostenki-14 (Russia): C1b, Goyet Q116-1 (Belgium) C1a, Sungir (Russia): C1a2, Ust'-Ishim and Oase-1: K2a) and mt-DNA haplogroup N, R, and U. (Note: Haplogroup N was found in two Gravettian-era fossils, Paglicci 52 Paglicci 12, and is widespread in Central Asia)

The Aurignacian material culture is associated with the expansion of "early West Eurasians" during the Upper Paleolithic (UP), replacing or merging with previous Initial Upper Paleolithic (IUP) cultures to which possibly relates the European Châtelperronian. Evidence for at least some IUP legacy among later UP Europeans is the presence of Ancient East Eurasian ancestry (c. 17–23%) among the GoyetQ116-1 specimen, possibly represented by the preceding Bacho Kiro cave specimen, who, together with the Oase specimens, are closer to ancient and modern East Eurasian populations. The 38kya Kostenki-14 specimen from eastern Europe did not display evidence for IUP-affiliated admixture. Villalba-Mouco et al. (2023) argues that this IUP-affiliated population pre-dated the split between European and Asian populations.

A 2023 study found that the Aurignacians are closely related to the Gravettians, Solutreans and later Magdalenians. Gravettian-producing peoples belonged to two genetically distinct clusters. Fournol in the west (France and Spain) and Věstonice in the east (Czech Republic, Poland, Austria, and Italy), both tracing their descent from producers of the earlier Aurignacian culture. The Aurignacian, Gravettian, and Solutrean cultures would merge and give rise to the Magdalenian culture. The genes of seven Magdalenians, the El Miron Cluster in Iberia, showed a close relationship to the Aurignacian population that lived in northern Europe some 20,000 years earlier. The analyses suggested that 70-80% of the ancestry of these individuals was from the population represented by Goyet Q116-1, associated with the Aurignacian culture.

The Upper Paleolithic Aurignacian, Gravettian, Solutrean and Magdalenian cultures, became subsequently absorbed by the Epigravettian wave from Western Asia (Anatolia). In a genetic study published in Nature in March 2023, the authors found that the ancestors of the Western Hunter-Gatherers (WHGs) were populations associated with the Epigravettian culture, which largely replaced populations associated with the Magdalenian culture about 14,000 years ago, and which were more closely related to ancient and modern peoples in the Middle East and the Caucasus than earlier European Cro-Magnons.

selected Aurignacian sites (CC BY-SA 4.0 ROCEEH)

== Location ==
A map of the Mediterranean with important Aurignacian sites (clickable map)

=== Europe ===
- Cave of Aurignac
- Bacho Kiro cave
- Chauvet Cave
- Hohle Fels
- Potok Cave

=== Asia ===
Lebanon/Palestine/Israel region

- Contained within a stratigraphic column, along with other cultures.
- Ksar Akil
- HaYonim Cave

Siberia

- Many sites in Siberia including around Lake Baikal, the Ob River valley, and Minusinsk.
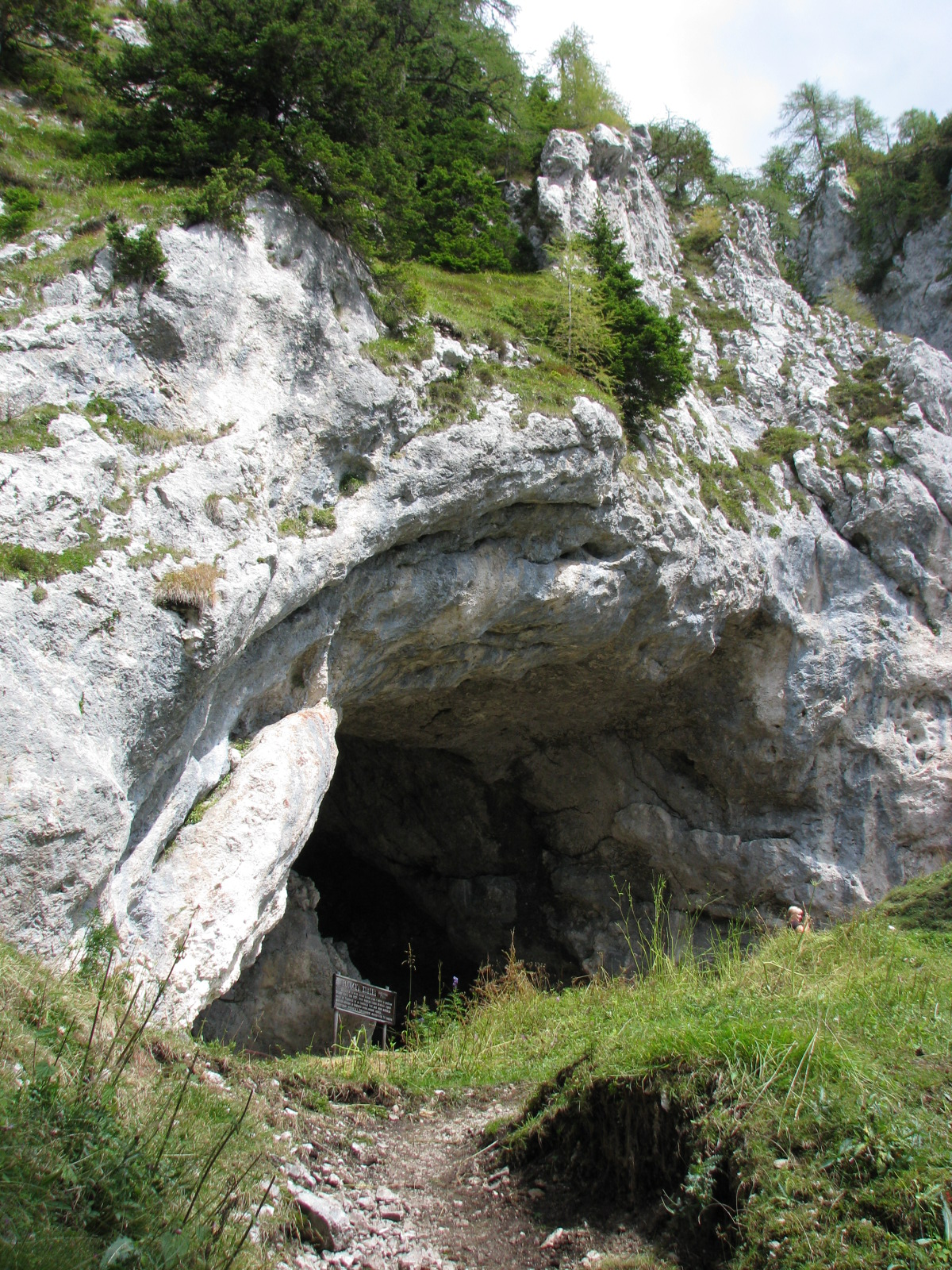
The entrance to the Potok Cave, a cave in the Eastern Karawanks, where the remains of a human residence dated to the Aurignacian (40,000 to 30,000 BP) were found

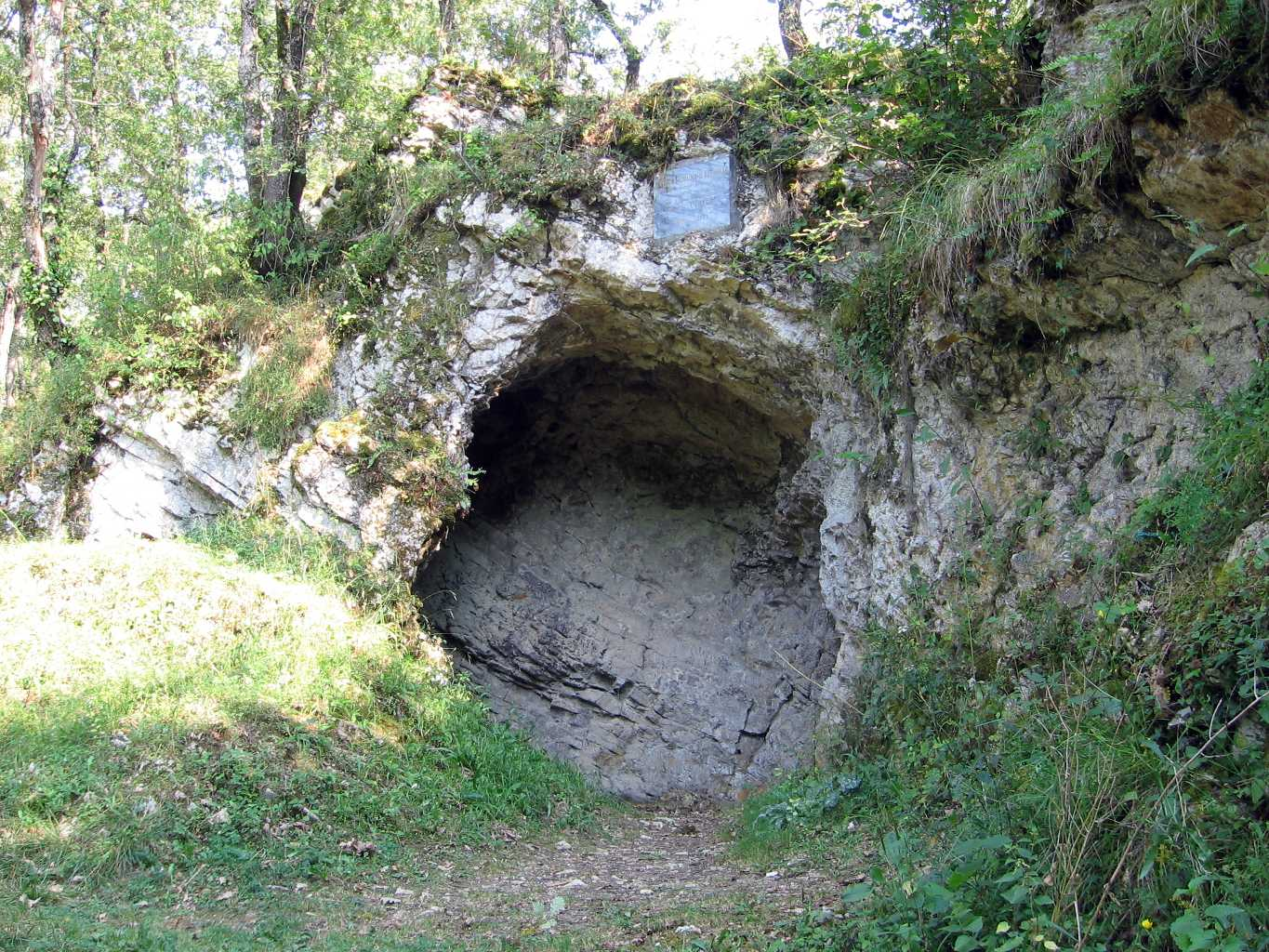
Entrance porch of the Cave of Aurignac

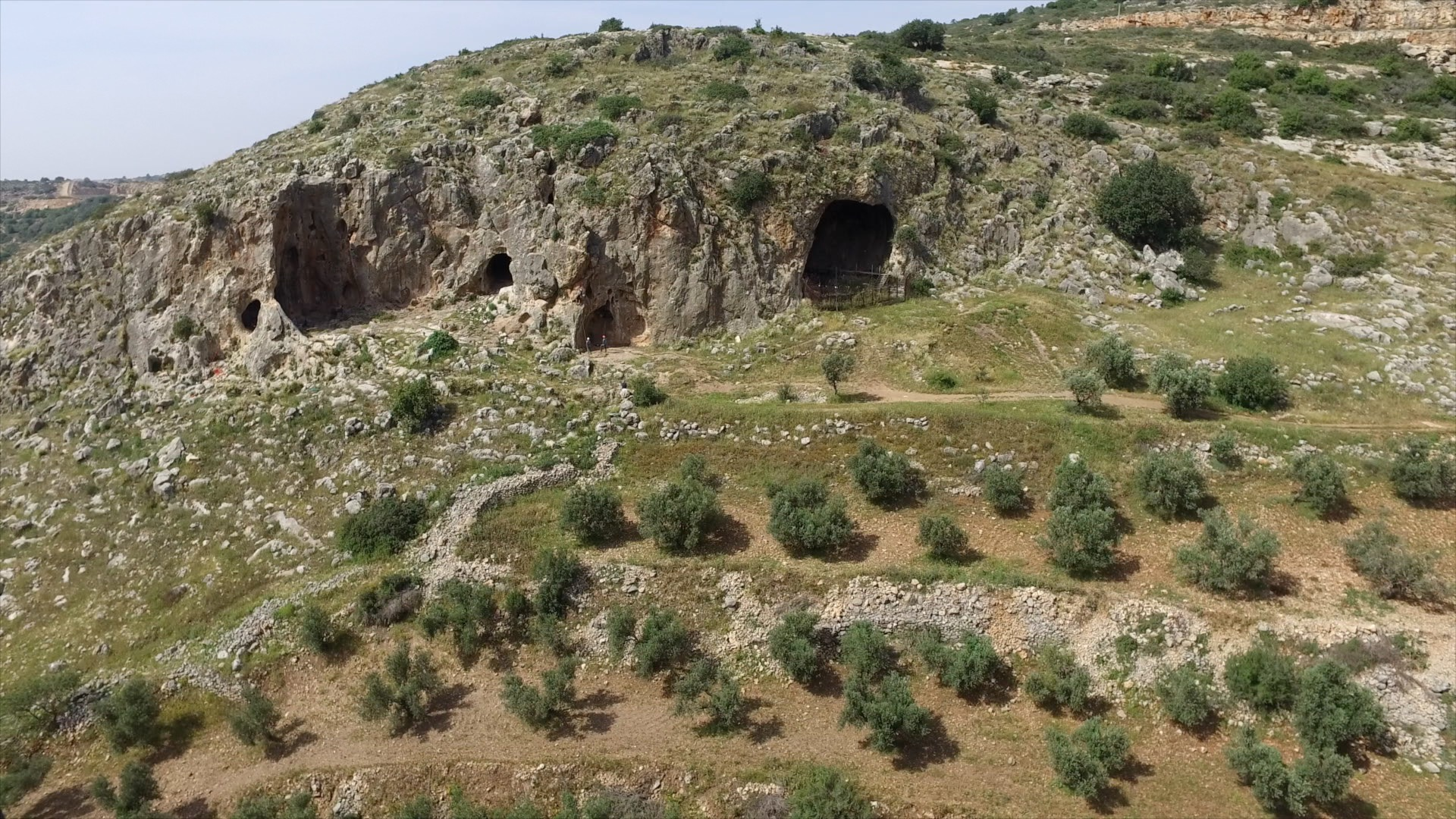
Hayonim Cave

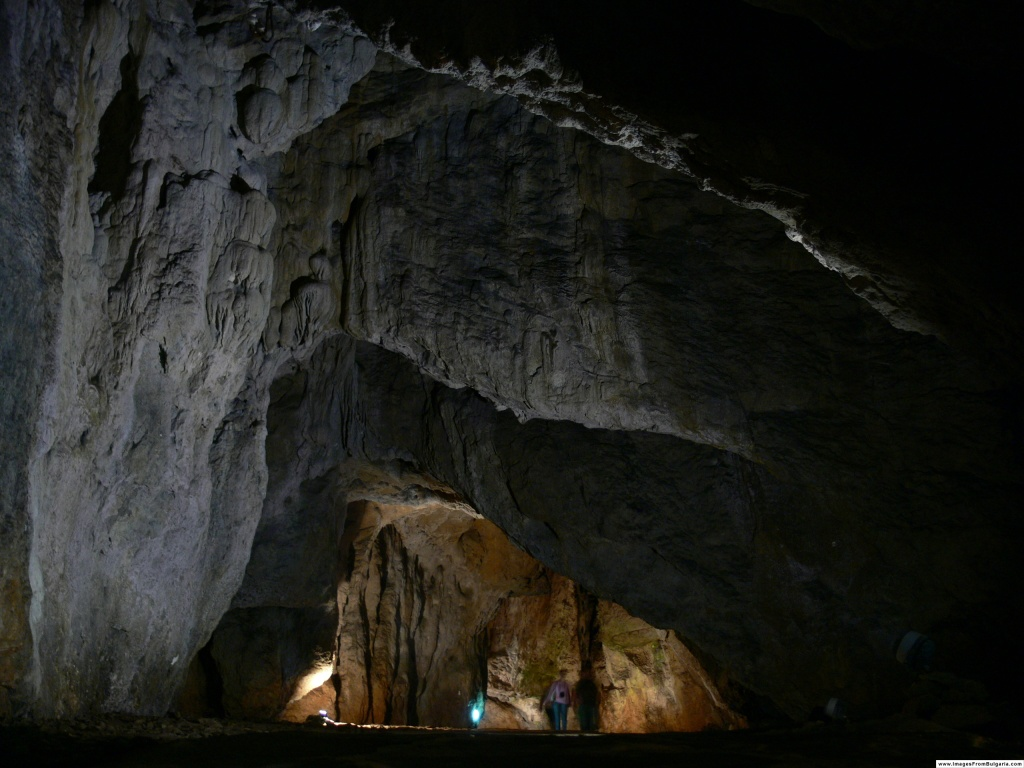
Interior of Bacho Kiro cave

== See also ==
- Cave of Aurignac
- Ksar Akil
- Venus figurine
- Bacho Kiro cave
- Montgaudier Cave

Preceded by Châtelperronian	Aurignacian; 43,000–26,000 BP	Succeeded by Gravettian

== Sources ==
- Fu, Qiaomei (2 May 2016). "The genetic history of Ice Age Europe". Nature. 534 (7606). Nature Research: 200–205. Bibcode:2016Natur.534..200F. doi:10.1038/nature17993. hdl:10211.3/198594. PMC 4943878. PMID 27135931.
