= Aurignac =

- Commune
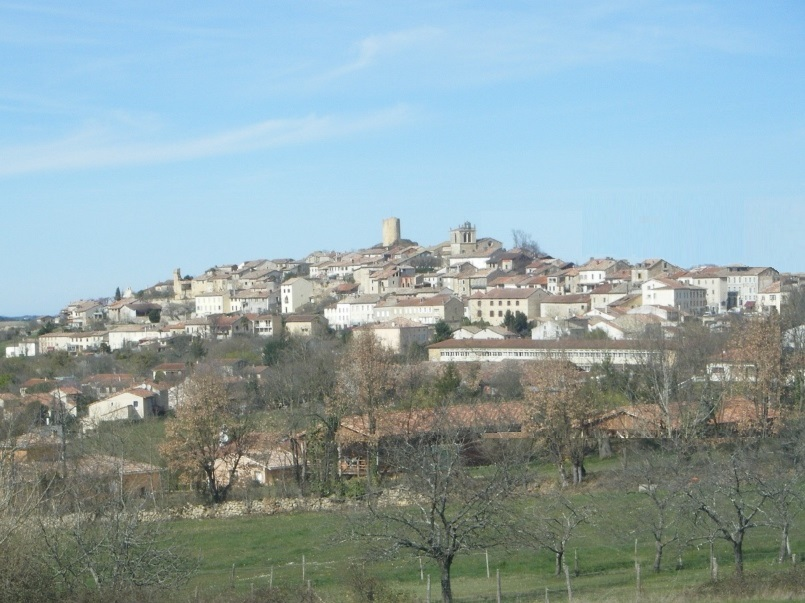
- Aurignac - from the south

- Coat of arms
- Location of Aurignac
- Location within France Location within Occitanie
- Coordinates: 43°13′10″N 0°52′49″E
- Country: France
- Region: Occitania
- Department: Haute-Garonne
- Arrondissement: Saint-Gaudens
- Canton: Cazères
- Intercommunality: CC Cœur Coteaux Comminges

Government
  - Mayor (2020–2026): Jean-Michel Losego
- Area^{1}: 17.95 km^{2} (6.93 sq mi)
- Elevation: 400 m (1,300 ft)
- Highest elevation: 511 m (1,677 ft)
- Lowest elevation: 295 m (968 ft)
- Population (2023): 1,229
  - Density: 68.47/km^{2} (177.3/sq mi)
- Time zone: UTC+01:00 (CET)
  - Summer (DST): UTC+02:00 (CEST)
- INSEE/Postal code: 31028 /31420
- ^{1} French Land Register data, which excludes lakes, ponds, glaciers > 1 km^{2} (0.386 sq mi or 247 acres) and river estuaries.

Aurignac (French pronunciation: [oʁiɲak]; Occitan: Aurinhac) is a commune in the Haute-Garonne department in southwestern France, close to the Pyrénées. It was the seat of the former canton of Aurignac (population 4,160), which was composed of 19 communes. It is part of the ancient region known as the Comminges.

== Geography ==
The town of Aurignac is located 60 km southwest of Toulouse and is, on average, 400m above sea level. It is in a regions of rolling hills close to the Pyrénées and is dominated by a ridge-shaped hill upon which the old town is built with the remains of a 13th-century castle at the top.

== History ==
Aurignac is best known for the 1860 discovery, by Édouard Lartet, of prehistoric remains at the Cave of Aurignac, which led to the definition of the Aurignacian culture, an important phase in human prehistory. Evidence of early modern humans (often called Cro-Magnon man) has been found in Africa as far back as 300,000 years ago. When they came to Europe, about 45,000 years ago, their culture appears to have flourished with major advances in the use of tools and the development of figurative art. The Aurignacian culture has been called the first modern humans in Europe.

The origins of the town are not defined, although the 1957 discovery of the remains of a Roman habitation, with a well-preserved bath-house, 2.5 km (1.6 mi) from the present-day town suggests that the area was inhabited during the Gallo-Roman period. In 777 a Benedictine priory was founded in Aurignac as a dependency of the Abbey of Saint Tiberi in the diocese of Agde. The first known official record is from 1109, regarding Roger d'Aurignac, the Seigneur of the town. In 1234, Bernard V, Count of Comminges, received the territory from his mother. By 1240, he had built a castle (the Château d'Aurignac) on the hill, around which the village grew.

Between the 14th and 17th centuries, Aurignac was one of the more important towns of the Comminges, with 44 communes in its dependence by 1336, and an important centre of commerce, based on the production of pottery and leather and holding frequent markets and fairs. In 1574 it was endowed with a post office regularly served by horses and carriages. Its population was recorded as 2,500 in 1699.

During the French wars of religion (1562–1598) the Comminges remained Catholic. Although a few towns were attacked by Huguenot forces, Aurignac remained safe. However it was required to provide troops and taxes to support the wars. In 1583 a group of bandits occupied the Chateau d'Aurignac, using it as a base to plunder the local population. At the request of the inhabitants of the town, the Senechal of Toulouse drove the bandits out and partly demolished the chateau. The extent to which it was demolished was disputed: a record of 1627 describes the roofs collapsed but the walls standing.

== Population ==
Historical population
Year	Pop.	±% p.a.
1968	971	—
1975	966	−0.07%
1982	976	+0.15%
1990	983	+0.09%
1999	980	−0.03%
2007	1,154	+2.06%
2012	1,174	+0.34%
2017	1,193	+0.32%
2023	1,229	+0.50%
Source: INSEE

The inhabitants of the commune are called Aurignacais in French.

== The old town ==
The old part of the town is centred on the remains of the castle dating from the 13th century, including the church, a well-restored keep (donjon), towers, gateways and the parts of the ramparts, some of which have been incorporated into houses. Extending down the hill is the 14th/15th century area, also originally walled.

== Church ==
The church of St-Pierre aux Liens dates from the 13th century, although there is a papal bull record of a church in Aurignac in 1120. The body of the church is original, but the building has been restored several times during its history. The main restoration in 1791 added the ornate entrance from the 16th-century chapel of St Michel, which was demolished during the revolution. The church contains a chapel of the Penitents Bleus, a civil religious organisation that played a major role in the community from the 17th to 19th centuries.

== Museum ==
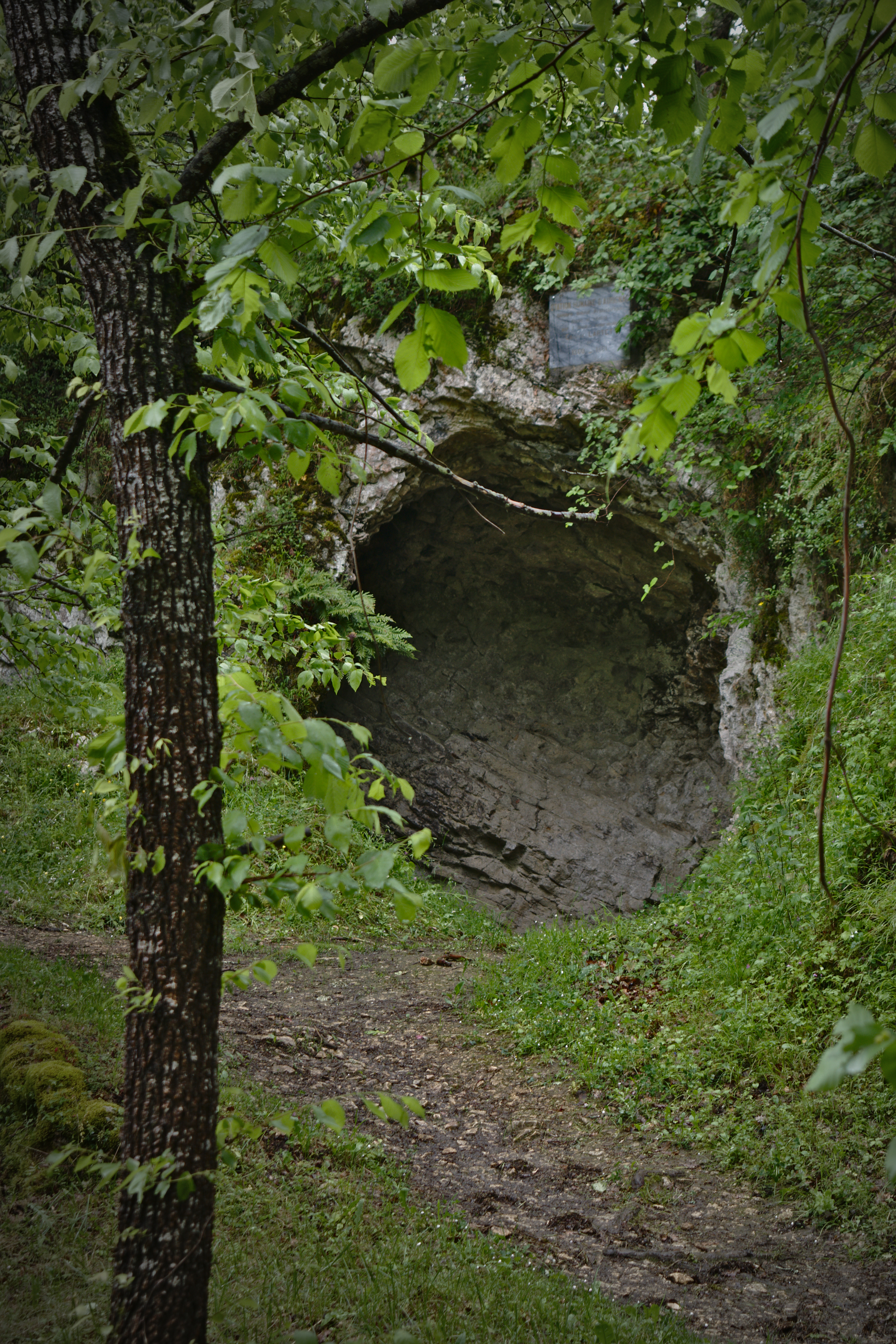
The Aurignac cave, type site of the Aurignacian period.

In 1968, a museum of prehistory was established in the town to house a collection of Aurignacian artefacts from the local site and others in France and abroad. The poor standard of accommodation for the museum resulted in its closure in 2006. However, in 2014 a larger museum was opened in a purpose-designed building containing a larger display of artefacts and information.

== Commerce and leisure ==
The commune has, for its size, a large number of shops and local businesses, including a quarry, agricultural and small-scale commercial enterprises. Aurignac has a gendarmerie, La Poste and two schools: primary and secondary, which serve the canton and some other surrounding communes. The town has a hotel, cafe, a brewery, a beer garden, a gym, and several restaurants. The leisure centre has an outdoor swimming pool, tennis courts and a football field.

There are a number of festivals during the year, most notably the three-day summer festival in August which includes a fairground, communal outdoor dining and a number of live bands and performers in the main square.

Aurignac is on the GR86, one of the less well-known Grande Randonnée, running from Toulouse to Bagnères-de-Luchon.

== International relations ==
Aurignac is twinned with Benabarre (Spain).

== See also ==
- Communes of the Haute-Garonne department
- Cave of Aurignac
