= Vasco-Cantabria =

Area on the northern coast of Spain

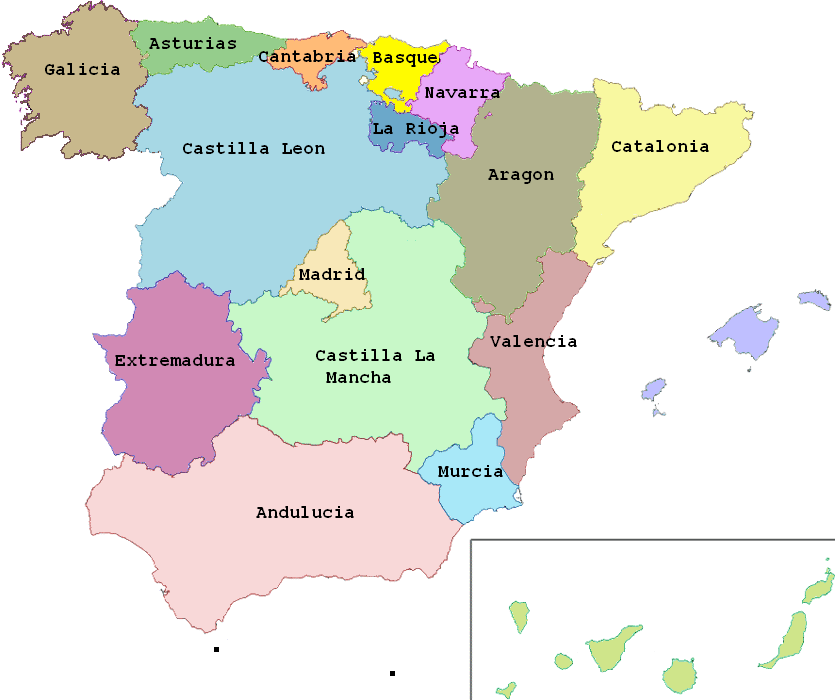
Modern regions of Spain

Vasco-Cantabria, in archaeology and the environmental sciences, is an area on the northern coast of Spain. It covers similar areas to the northern parts of the adjacent modern regions of the Basque country and Cantabria. In geology the "Vasco-Cantabrian Basin" or "Basque-Cantabrian Basin" covers the area and the seas off the coast in the Bay of Biscay, an area between the Iberian and European tectonic plates.

The area is of special significance in the archaeology of the Upper Palaeolithic, Epipalaeolithic and Mesolithic periods of the Stone Age. A narrow coastal strip was a glacial refugium, never covered by glaciers during the Last Glacial Maximum, and appears to have been densely populated. It is part of the wider Franco-Cantabrian region (also Franco-Cantabric region) that stretches from Asturias, the next region west of Cantabria, to Provence in southeastern France.

The main archaeological industries in the area during this period are the Middle Paleolithic Mousterian, the Upper Paleolithic Chatelperronian, Aurignacian, Gravettian, Solutrean, Magdalenian, and then the Azilian, which is variously classified as Late Paleolithic, Epipalaeolithic and Mesolithic. Vasco-Cantabrian sites contain much of the surviving art of the Upper Paleolithic, especially in terms of cave paintings. The UNESCO World Heritage Site "Cave of Altamira and Paleolithic Cave Art of Northern Spain" consists of ten caves in Cantabria and three in the Basque County, as well as five from Asturias.

== Flora and fauna ==
The region is and was part of the Eurosiberian climatic zone, and remained relatively moist throughout the period, unlike much of Spain. In the relevant period common trees included birch, Scots pine, beech, juniper and willow, all of which fluctuated with changes in temperature. The animal remains commonly found at human sites include red deer, aurochs, ibex, horse and goats. Reindeer are rare, unlike in southern France.

During this period the climate fluctuated, and warmer periods brought a great increase in forest cover, changing the populations of larger animals, with herd animals preferring a more open landscape, notably bison, horse and red deer, giving way to "smaller, less gregarious game", such as wild boar and roe deer. At the start of the Holocene, a rise in sea levels considerably reduced the width of the coastal strip, taking some 6–16 km from a strip that had only been 25–50 km wide between the sea to the north and the Cantabrian Mountains and their glaciers, which lie to the south of the whole region.

== Selected archaeological sites ==
=== Cantabria ===
- Cave of El Castillo in the Caves of Monte Castillo group, Cantabria. Important early cave paintings
- Cave of La Pasiega
- Cave of Altamira
- Cave del Valle (Cantabria)
- El Mirón Cave
- Cave of Chufín
- more at Caves in Cantabria

=== Basque Country ===
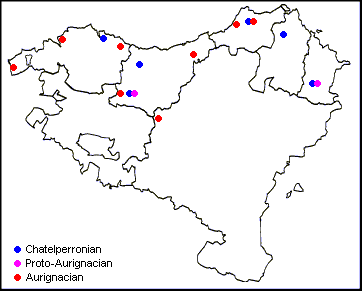
Main Early Upper Paleolithic sites in the Basque Country. None are far from the coast.

- Armintxe Cave
- Cave of Altxerri
- Santimamiñe, paintings, and a long continuous sequence from the Mousterian to the Azilian
- Praileaitz Cave
