= Franco-Cantabrian region =

Prehistoric European region

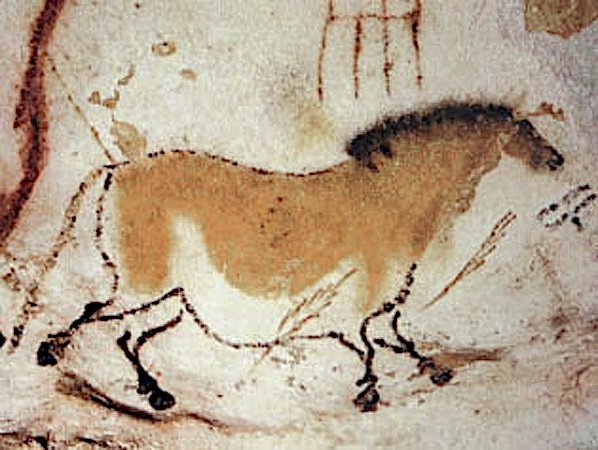
The inhabitants of the Franco-Cantabrian region produced some of the finest Paleolithic mural art, such as this horse at Lascaux Cave, Dordogne.

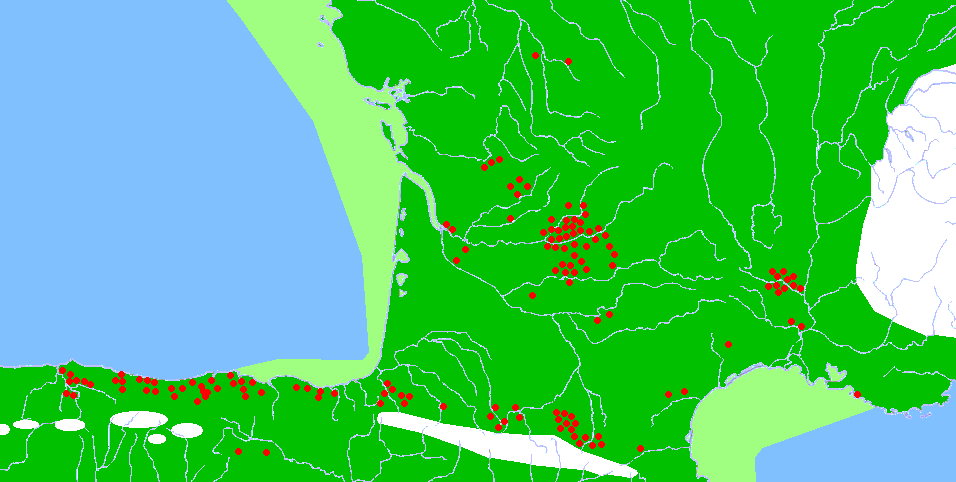
Map of the Franco-Cantabrian region, showing the main caves containing mural art.

The Franco-Cantabrian region (also Franco-Cantabric region) is a term applied in archaeology and history to refer to an area that stretches from Asturias, in northern Spain, to Aquitaine and Provence in Southern France. It includes the southern half of France and the northern strip of Spain looking at the Bay of Biscay (known as Cantabrian Sea in Spanish, hence the name).

This region shows intense homogeneity in the prehistorical record and possibly was the region of Europe with the densest population of humans during the Late Paleolithic. Vasco-Cantabria is part of the region, on the northern coast of Spain, covering similar areas to the adjacent modern regions of the Basque country and Cantabria.

== Archaeology ==
Successively, the region experienced the Chatelperronian, Aurignacian, Gravettian, Solutrean, Magdalenian, Azilian, and post Azilian geometric cultures, with their respective cultural expressions, noticeably the most famous mural art. Solutrean, Magdalenian, and Azilian cultures evolved locally in this area.

== Glacial refugium and Late Glacial population expansion ==
The region may have been a major refugium for Paleolithic peoples during the Last Glacial Maximum, apparently playing a major role as source for the repopulation of Europe after that extremely cold period ended.

From an archaeological viewpoint, Jean-Pierre Bocquet-Appel has argued that "there are grounds for considering that the Aquitaine and French-Cantabrian refuge zone, may have been the principal source of Late Glacial re-colonization". His demographic simulations, based in archaeological data, suggest that it was the most densely populated region of Europe through all the Upper Paleolithic. Kieran O'Hara has suggested in his book Cave Art and Climate Change that climate controlled the Franco-Cantabrian cave depictions.

== Dissolution of the regional homogeneity in the Neolithic ==
The area became culturally divided between the Mediterranean and the Atlantic subareas during the Neolithic period, losing its homogeneity as the Eastern part strongly incorporated the Cardium pottery culture, while the Western remained less developed (subneolithic).

== Main sites ==
- Altamira, Cantabria, Spain

Important cave paintings

- Cave of Chufín, Cantabria, Spain
- Cave of El Castillo, Cantabria, Spain
- Cave of La Pasiega, Cantabria, Spain
- La Garma cave complex, Cantabria, Spain
- Tito Bustillo Cave, Asturias, Spain
- Santimamiñe, Basque Country, Spain
- Aurignac, Occitanie, France
- Les Trois Frères, Occitanie, France
- Lascaux, Nouvelle-Aquitaine, France
- La Madeleine, Nouvelle-Aquitaine, France
- Grotte Chauvet, Auvergne-Rhône-Alpes, France

== See also ==
- Prehistoric art
- Upper Paleolithic
- Cro-Magnon
