= Cave del Valle (Cantabria) =

Cave and archaeological site in Spain

- La Viejarrona
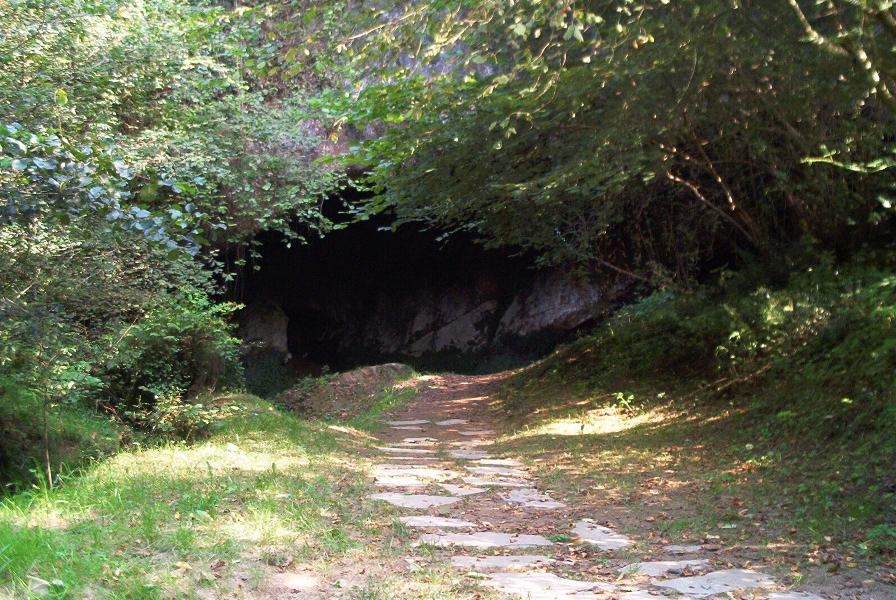
- Cave entrance

- location in Cantabria, Spain
- 43°17′55″N 3°25′10″W
- Type: Archaeological site
- Periods: Upper Magdalenian
- Associated with: Azilian
- Location: Rasines, Cantabria, Spain

History
- Built: c. 7000 BC

Site notes
- Length: 60 km (37.28 mi)
- Excavation dates: 1905, 1996-1998
- Discovered: 1905

Cave del Valle (Spanish: Cueva del Valle, The Valley's Cave), locally also known as La Viejarrona (Old Girl), is located near El Cerro Village in the municipality of Rasines in Cantabria, northern Spain. The cave is the source of the Silencio River, a tributary of the Rio Ruahermosa, which in turn is a tributary of the Asón River. Notable for its prehistoric, but particularly for its speleologic significance as it is recognized as one of the longest cavities in the world. The site is very popular among cavers, who have explored a total of over 60 km (37.28 mi) so far.

== Prehistoric occupation ==
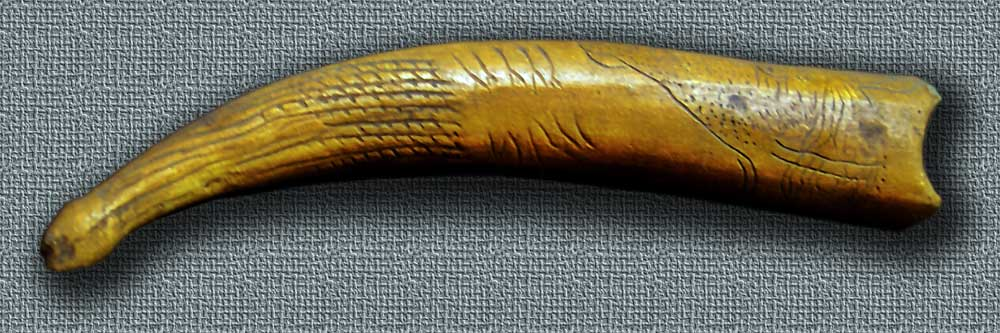
a cane found in the cave

Although situated in the renown Franco-Cantabrian region, the discovery of prehistoric rock paintings has never been reported. In 1905, a priest named Lorenzo Sierra discovered the first objects, tools and artifacts that account for human occupation as early as 7000 BC. Documented are Azilian harpoons and scrapers, Upper Magdalenian spear points and other bone tools. Stone tools include chisels and various types of scrapers. Latest excavations were made from 1996-1998. A perforated and decorated stick of archaeological interest was found at this site, but is now lost. However, the National Archaeological Museum retains a copy and there exists another pierced pole, preserved in the Regional Museum of Prehistory and Archaeology of Cantabria, although of less importance than the lost specimen as it is not decorated.

== Caving site ==
The cave of the valley is recognized as one of the longest explored caves in the world with more than 40 mi (64.37 km) yet explored. The site is, apart from professional speleologists, also well known among sport - and hobby practitioners of caving.

== See also ==
Caves in Cantabria
