= Cave of Altxerri =

Cave and archaeological site with prehistoric paintings in Spain

- Cueva de Altxerri (Spanish)
- Altxerriko leizea
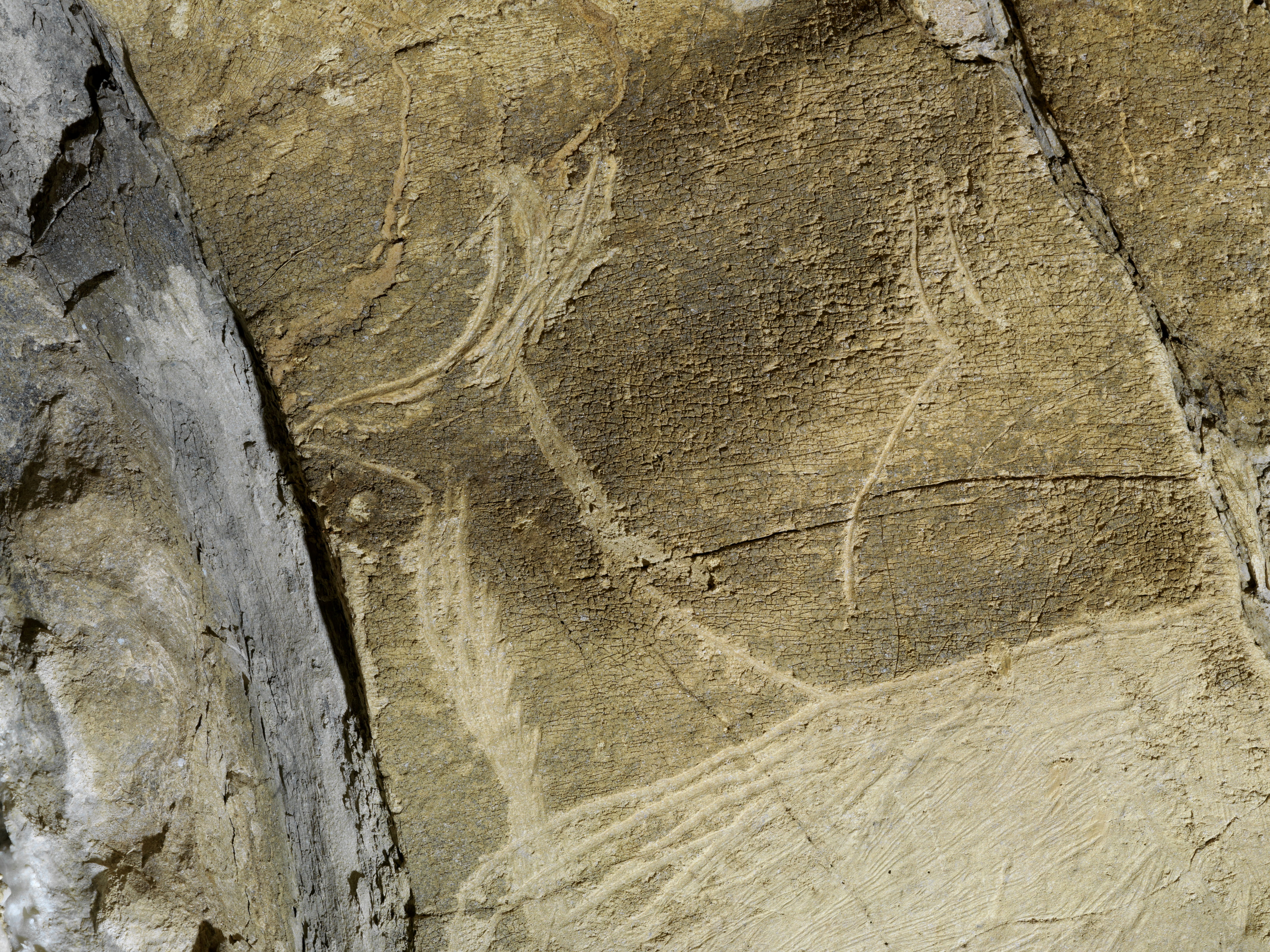

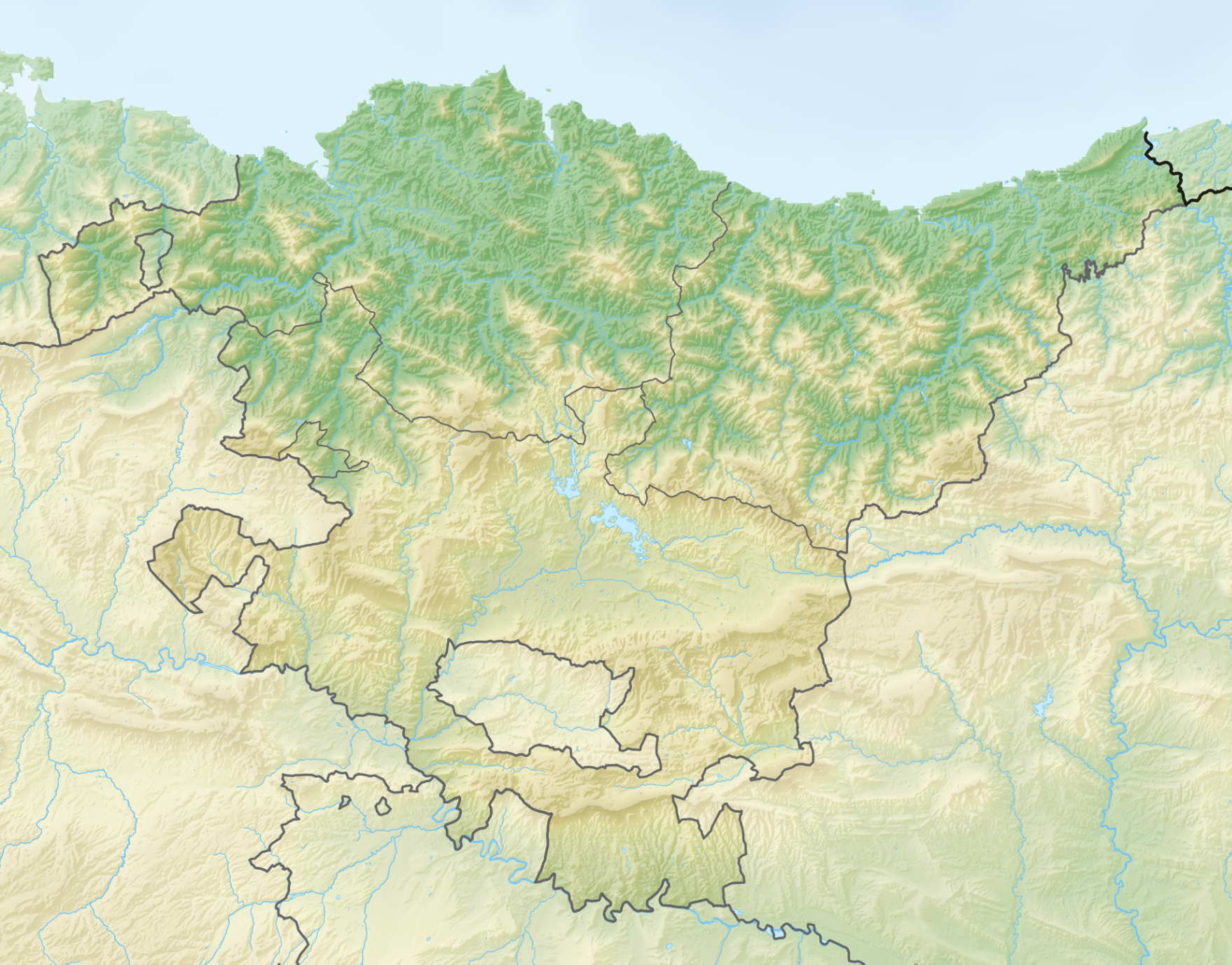
- location in Spain Cave of Altxerri (Spain)
- 43°16′7″N 2°8′2″W
- Location: Aia, Gipuzkoa
- Region: Basque Country

Site notes
- Public access: no

UNESCO World Heritage Site
- Official name: Altxerri
- Type: Cultural
- Criteria: i, iii
- Designated: 1985 (9th session)
- Part of: Cave of Altamira and Paleolithic Cave Art of Northern Spain
- Reference no.: 310-018
- Region: Europe and North America

Spanish Cultural Heritage
- Official name: Cuevas de Altexerri
- Type: Non-movable
- Criteria: Monument
- Designated: 17 July 1984
- Reference no.: RI-51-0005144

The Cave of Altxerri (in Spanish "Cueva de Altxerri", and in Basque Altxerriko leizea or Altxerriko koba) is located in the municipality of Aya (Gipuzkoa) in the Basque Country (Spain).

The original grotto preserves rock paintings and engravings which have been dated from the end of the Upper Magdalenian period, within the Upper Paleolithic; the pictures situated in an upper gallery, known as Altxerri B, have been dated in a 2013 study as the oldest stone paintings in Europe, with an estimated age of 39,000 years.

Its artistic style forms part of the so-called Franco-Cantabrian School, characterized by the realism of the figures presented.

Altxerri houses one of the largest sets of rock engravings of the area. It contains around one hundred and twenty engravings of which ninety-two are of animals. The bison is the best-represented animal, with a total of fifty-three engravings. Other animals present in the cave are the reindeer, with six engravings, four deer and goats, three horses and aurochs, two saiga antelope, a wolverine, a fox, a hare and a bird.

It was declared a World Heritage Site in 2008, together with sixteen other caves situated in Northern Spain, as part of the group known as the Cave of Altamira and Paleolithic Cave Art of Northern Spain.

The cave is closed to the public.
