= Cave of Altamira and Paleolithic Cave Art of Northern Spain =

Cave with prehistoric art

UNESCO World Heritage Site
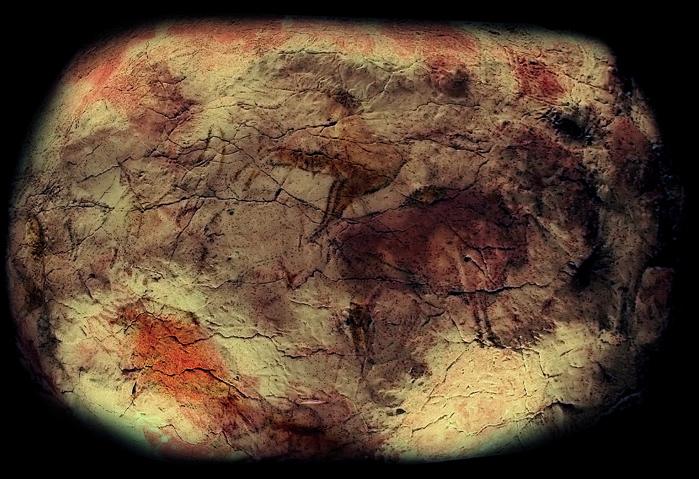
- Replica of the Cave of Altamira at the National Archaeological Museum (Madrid)

- Location within Earth
- Location: Northern Spain
- Includes: 1. Altamira; 2. La Peña de Candamo; 3. Tito Bustillo; 4. Covaciella; 5. Llonín; 6. El Pindal; 7. Chufín; 8. Hornos de la Peña; 9. Monte Castillo: El Castillo; 10. Monte Castillo: Las Monedas; 11. Monte Castillo: La Pasiega; 12. Monte Castillo: Las Chimeneas; 13. El Pendo; 14. La Garma; 15. Covalanas; 16. Santimamiñe; 17. Ekain; 18. Altxerri
- Criteria: Cultural: (i), (iii)
- Reference: 310bis
- Inscription: 1985 (9th Session)
- Extensions: 2008
- Buffer zone: 2,234.706 ha (5,522.08 acres)
- Coordinates: 43°22′39″N 4°07′21″W

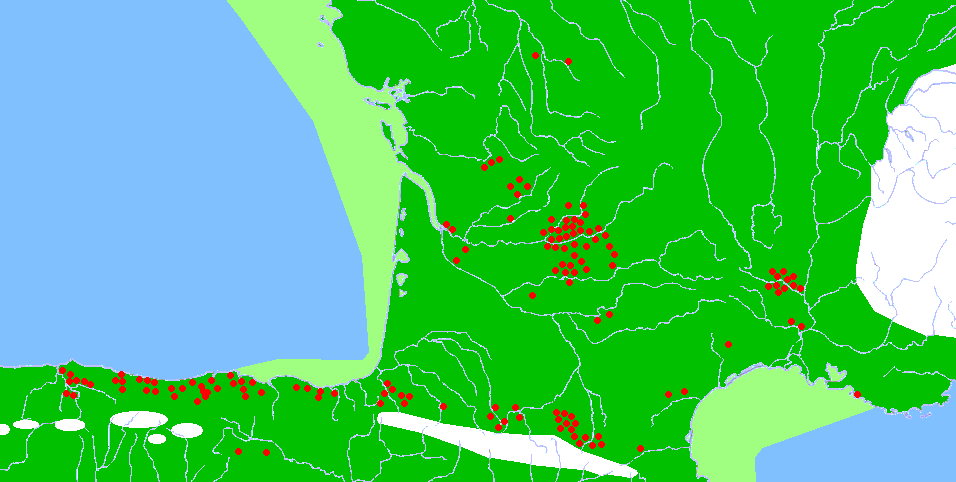
Map of Paleolithic cave art sites in the Franco-Cantabrian region.

The Cave of Altamira and Paleolithic Cave Art of Northern Spain (Cueva de Altamira y arte rupestre paleolítico del Norte de España) is a grouping of 18 caves of northern Spain, which together represent the apogee of Upper Paleolithic cave art in Europe between 35,000 and 11,000 years ago (Aurignacian, Gravettian, Solutrean, Magdalenian, Azilian). In 2008, they were collectively designated a World Heritage Site by UNESCO.

Chief among these caves is Altamira, located within the town of Santillana del Mar in Cantabria. It remains one of the most important painting cycles of prehistory, originating in the Magdalenian and Solutrean periods of the Upper Paleolithic. This cave's artistic style represents the Franco-cantabrian school, characterized by the realism of its figural representation. Altamira Cave was declared a World Heritage Site in 1985. In 2008, the World Heritage Site was expanded to include 17 additional caves located in three autonomous communities of northern Spain: Asturias, Cantabria and the Basque Country.

== List of caves ==
Code	Name	Location	Coordinates	Buffer zone
310-001	Cueva de Altamira	Cantabria, Santillana del Mar	43°22′57″N 04°07′13″W	16 ha
310-002	Cueva de la Peña de Candamo	Asturias, Candamo, San Román	43°27′21″N 6°4′21″W	100 ha
310-003	Cueva de Tito Bustillo	Asturias, Ribadesella	43°27′39″N 5°4′4″W	243 ha
310-004	Cueva de La Covaciella	Asturias, Cabrales	43°19′5″N 4°52′30″W	11.3 ha
310-005	Cueva de Llonín	Asturias, Peñamellera Alta	43°19′50″N 4°38′43″W	17.4 ha
310-006	Cueva del Pindal	Asturias, Ribadedeva	43°23′51″N 4°31′58″W	69.4 ha
310-007	Cueva de Chufín	Cantabria, Rionansa	43°17′26″N 4°27′29″W	16.7 ha
310-008	Cueva de Hornos de la Peña	Cantabria, San Felices de Buelna	43°15′40″N 4°1′47″W	25 ha
310-009	Cueva de El Castillo	Cantabria Puente Viesgo, Cantabria	43°17′33″N 3°57′56″W	69 ha
310-010	Cueva de Las Monedas	Cantabria, Puente Viesgo	43°17′20″N 3°58′03″W	69 ha
310-011	Cueva de La Pasiega	Cantabria, Puente Viesgo	43°17′20″N 3°57′58″W	69 ha
310-012	Cueva de Las Chimeneas	Cantabria Puente Viesgo	43°17′29″N 3°57′52″W	69 ha
310-013	Cueva de El Pendo	Cantabria, Camargo	43°23′17″N 3°54′44″W	64 ha
310-014	Cueva de La Garma	Cantabria, Ribamontán al Monte	43°25′50″N 3°39′57″W	100 ha
310-015	Cueva de Covalanas	Cantabria, Ramales de la Victoria	43°14′44″N 3°27′08″W	1374 ha
310-016	Cueva de Santimamiñe	País Vasco, Vizcaya, Cortézubi	43°20′47″N 2°38′12″W	99 ha
310-017	Cueva de Ekain	País Vasco, Guipúzcoa, Deva	43°14′09″N 02°16′31″W	14.6 ha
310-018	Cueva de Altxerri	País Vasco, Guipúzcoa, Aia	43°16′7″N 02°08′02″W	15 ha

== See also ==
- National Museum and Research Center of Altamira
- Caves in Cantabria
- Franco-Cantabrian region
- Art of the Upper Paleolithic
- List of Stone Age art
