= Tito Bustillo Cave =

Cave and archaeological site with prehistoric paintings in Spain

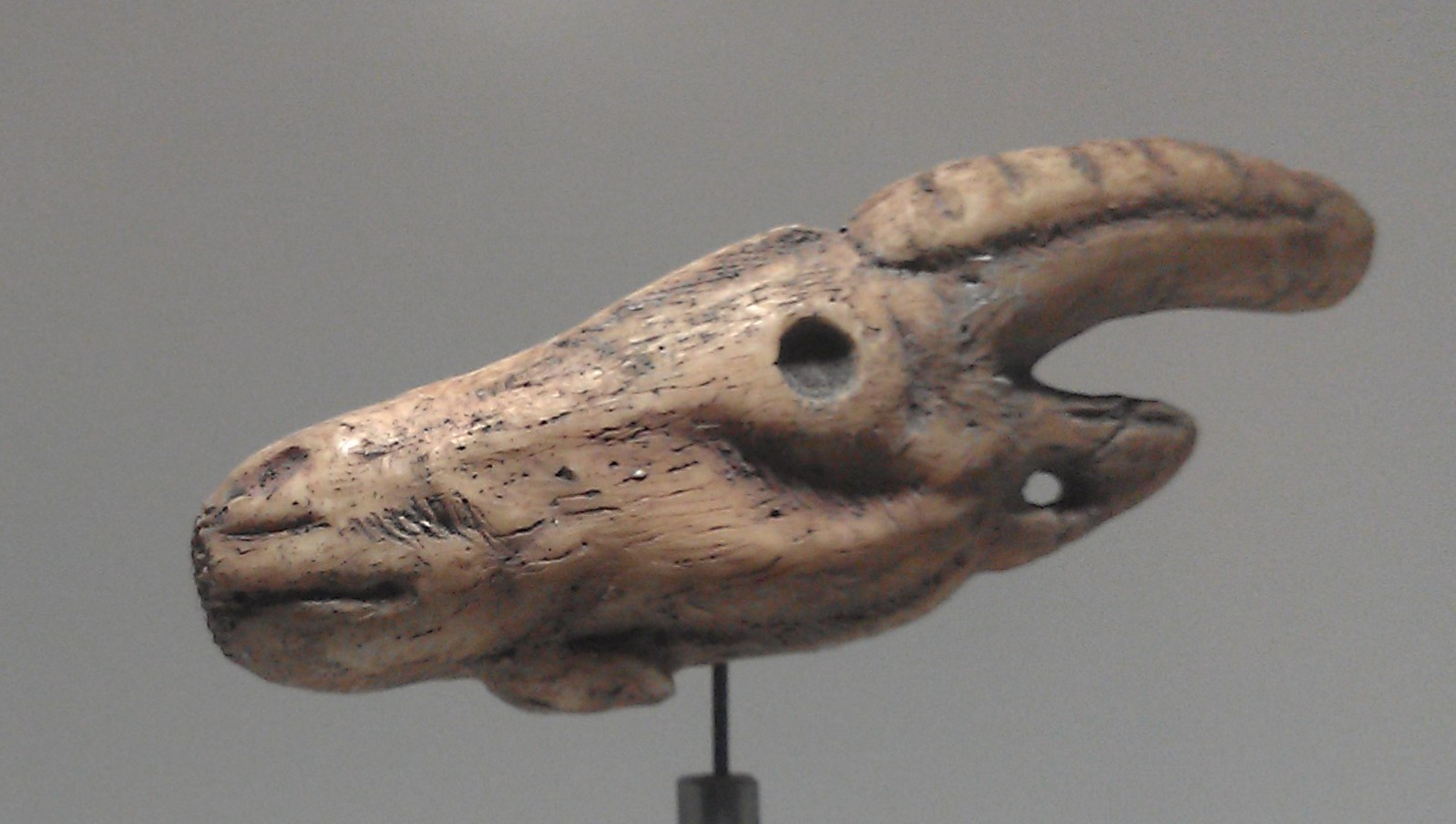
- Carved staghorn found in the cave

- Location in Spain Tito Bustillo Cave (Spain)
- 43°27′38.52″N 5°4′3.72″W
- Location: Ribadesella
- Region: Asturias, Spain

UNESCO World Heritage Site
- Official name: Tito Bustillo
- Type: Cultural
- Criteria: i, iii
- Designated: 1985 (9th session)
- Part of: Cave of Altamira and Paleolithic Cave Art of Northern Spain
- Reference no.: 310-003
- Region: Europe and North America
- Buffer zone: 243.38 ha (601.4 acres)

Spanish Cultural Heritage
- Official name: Cueva de Tito Bustillo
- Type: Non-movable
- Criteria: Monument
- Designated: 12 March 1970
- Reference no.: RI-51-0003839

The Tito Bustillo Cave is a prehistoric rock shelter located in the small town of Ribadesella, in the autonomous community of Asturias, Spain. The cave was inhabited by humans (cro-magnon) before the year 10,000 BC. Due to the collapse of the rock, the original entrance to the cave was sealed thousands of years ago, which made it possible for preservation of objects, tools and wall paintings that were discovered in 1968. Based on those objects found in the cave, it is known that there was a significant human presence during the Magdalenian culture of the Upper Palaeolithic, but the cave was probably inhabited before that time.

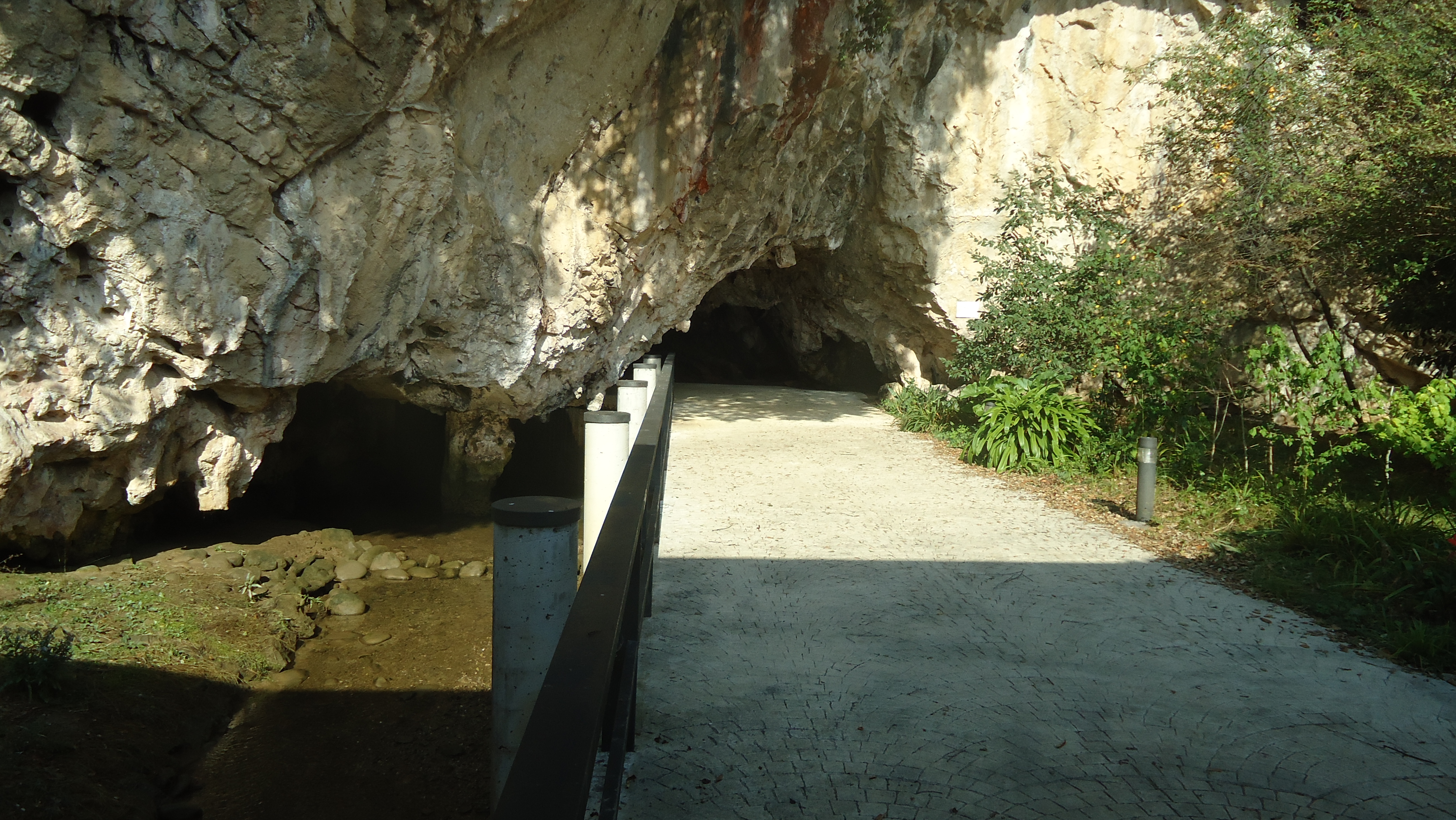
Entrance to the cave

The Tito Bustillo Cave has been designated a World Heritage Site, as part of the Cave of Altamira and Paleolithic Cave Art of Northern Spain, and it has 12 prehistorical paintings, making it one of the most complete examples of the prehistoric art in the north of Spain. The oldest of these paintings shows human figures and is around 33,000 years old, as determined by radiocarbon dating. Some scientists believe it could have been made by Neanderthals, though this theory hasn't been proven.

Some of the paintings represent animals: horses, deer, moose and even a marine animal (probably a whale) and they are believed to have had some kind of ritual purpose to improve their hunting. There is also a panel representing female genitalia and it is believed to have had the intention to invoke fertility. The oldest painting in the cave represents an anthropomorphic figure, part male, part female.

Apart from the paintings, some objects from the Magdalenian period were perfectly preserved. The most important ones are some harpoons made of bone and a carved staghorn of a goat head.
