= Caves of Monte Castillo =

Caves with prehistoric art in Spain

UNESCO World Heritage Site
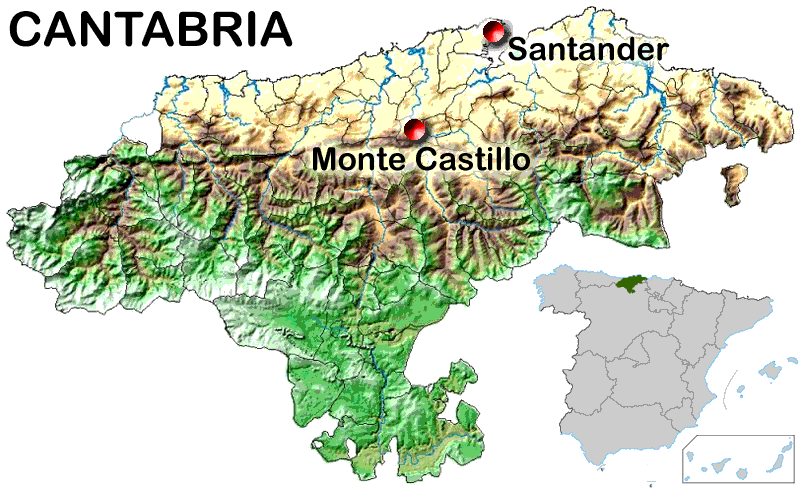
- Location of monte Castillo in Cantabria

- Location within Spain
- Location: Puente Viesgo, Cantabria, Spain
- Part of: Cave of Altamira and Paleolithic Cave Art of Northern Spain
- Includes: El Castillo; Las Monedas; La Pasiega; Las Chimeneas
- Criteria: Cultural: (i), (iii)
- Reference: 310bis
- Inscription: 1985 (9th Session)
- Extensions: 2008
- Buffer zone: 275.72 ha (681.3 acres)
- Coordinates: 43°17′28″N 3°57′51″W

The Caves of Monte Castillo, located in the Cantabrian town of Puente Viesgo, contain one of the most important Paleolithic sites in the region. The complex of karstic caves is on the slopes of Monte Castillo, a hill south of Puente Viesgo, with an elevation of 354 m. It includes four out of the eighteen caves listed as World Heritage of UNESCO since July 2008 under the title of Cave of Altamira and Paleolithic Cave Art of Northern Spain: El Castillo, Las Chimeneas, and La Pasiega and Las Monedas. In addition, the complex includes a minor fifth cave, La Flecha. The caves are located along the Pas river in the Castillo mountain, squarely at the intersection of three valleys and near the coast.

The El Castillo cave contains decorations in red ochre in the forms of hand stencils dated to about 35,000. One red disk in El Castillo has been dated to before 40,000 years ago in a 2012 study, making it the oldest known dated cave decoration. The Cave of El Castillo was discovered in 1903 by Hermilio Alcalde del Río. It was first explored and excavated by Hugo Obermaier.

The Cueva de Las Monedas was discovered in 1952. It was explored by Eduardo Ripoll Perelló (1923–2006). The cave is named for a number of 16th-century coins found inside. The paintings in this cave date to the Magdalenian, about 13,000 years ago, depicting horses, goats, bears, bison and reindeer.

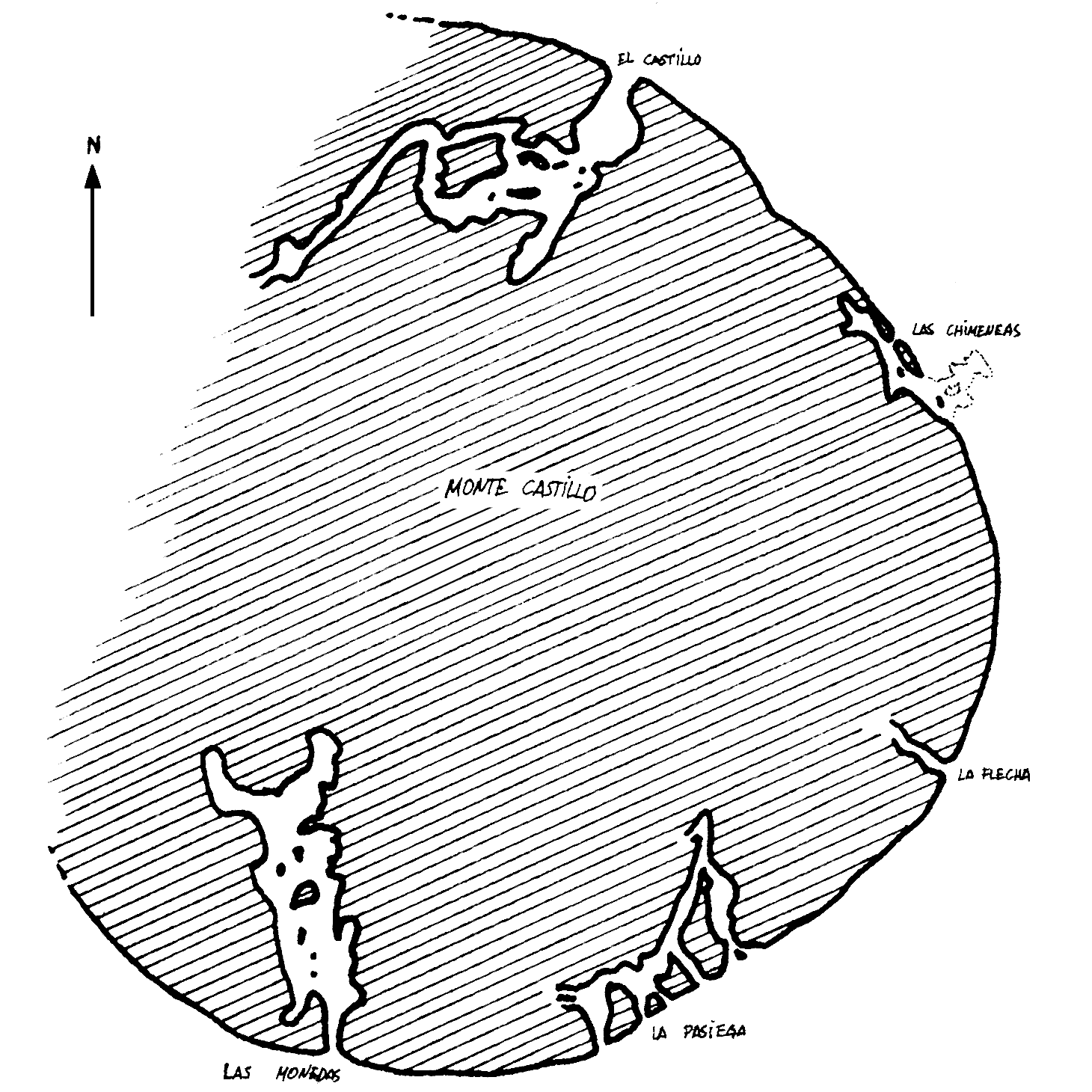
Map of the position of the caves on Monte Castillo.

== See also ==
- Art of the Upper Paleolithic
- List of Stone Age art
