= La Garma cave complex =

Cave complex and archaeological site with prehistoric paintings in Spain

- Complejo kárstico del monte de La Garma
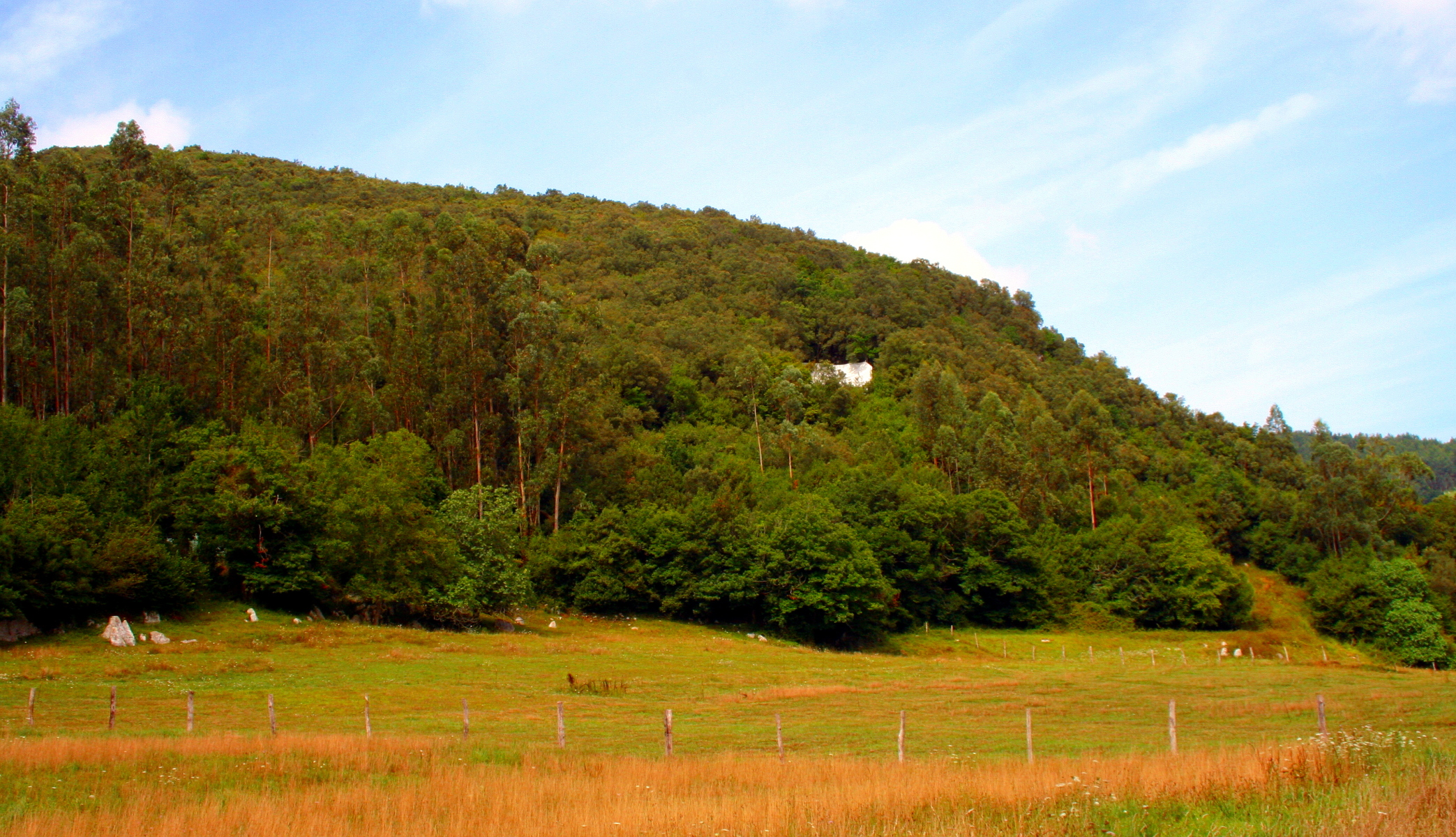
- Approach to the cave, entrance covered by a white sheet

- Location in Spain La Garma cave complex (Cantabria)
- 43°25′50″N 3°39′57″W
- Type: karst cave complex
- Location: Cantabria, Spain

Site notes
- Condition: excellent
- Public access: No

UNESCO World Heritage Site
- Official name: La Garma
- Type: Cultural
- Criteria: i, iii
- Designated: 1985 (9th session)
- Part of: Cave of Altamira and Paleolithic Cave Art of Northern Spain
- Reference no.: 310-014
- Region: Europe and North America

Spanish Cultural Heritage
- Official name: Complejo Kárstico del Monte de la Garma
- Type: Non-movable
- Criteria: Archaeological site
- Designated: 7 July 1998
- Reference no.: RI-55-0000118

The La Garma cave complex is a parietal art-bearing paleoanthropological cave system in Cantabria, Spain. It is located just north of the village of Omoño, part of the municipality of Ribamontán al Monte. The cave complex is noted for one of the best preserved floors from the Paleolithic containing more than 4,000 fossils and more than 500 graphical units. It is part of the Cave of Altamira and Paleolithic Cave Art of Northern Spain World Heritage Site.

== Description ==
The La Garma cave complex is a parietal art-bearing paleoanthropological cave system in Cantabria, Spain, located on the southern side of La Garma Hill, north of the village of Omoño, part of the municipality of Ribamontán al Monte.

The cave complex contains more than 4,000 fossils and more than 500 graphical units, with 109 signs, 92 animal figures, and 40 hand stencils. The cave complex contains one of the best preserved floors from the Paleolithic. La Garma is listed as part of the Cave of Altamira and Paleolithic Cave Art of Northern Spain World Heritage Site.

There are ten archaeological sites situated around La Garma Hill (elevation 185 m (607 ft) above sea level): the Lower Gallery (Galería Inferior), La Garma A, La Garma B, La Garma C, La Garma D, Cueva del Mar, El Truchiro, Peredo, Valladar, and a hillfort, Castro de La Garma. Cueva del Mar, Peredo, and Valladar are not part of the La Garma cave system. The La Garma cave system shows evidence of human use from 175,000 years ago through the Middle Ages.

=== La Garma A ===
As of 2016 the entrance to the cave system leads through La Garma A, as the only entrance into the cave system. It lies at 80 m (262 ft) above sea level and has an extensive stratigraphy, containing Aurignacian, Gravettian, Solutrean, and Magdalenian layers, as well as Mesolithic, Neolithic, Chalcolithic, Bronze Age, and Middle Ages layers.

=== La Garma B ===
La Garma B lies at 70 m (230 ft) above sea level and is situated between La Garma A and the Lower Gallery. La Garma B contains Chacolithic and Bronze Age layers. La Garma B leads into the Intermediate Gallery, which contains Paleolithic cave paintings and deposits.

=== Lower Gallery ===
The Lower Gallery of La Garma is situated at 59 m (194 ft) above sea level and is around 300 m (984 ft) in length. It was discovered in November 1995. Its original entrance was sealed during the Pleistocene by a rockslide about 16,000 years ago, preserving the cave floor in a pristine manner. The Magdalenian Lower Gallery cave floor is one of the best preserved Paleolithic cave floors ever discovered, and thus of great interest to paleoanthropologists. Researchers have divided the Lower Gallery into nine zones. The archaeological finds are found primarily in Zones I, III, and IV. The floor covers an area of more than 500 m^{2} (5,382 sq ft). Thousands of animal bones and sea shells were found in this section, including Lithic, antler, and bone artefacts. Three stone structures, likely indicative of residential use, were discovered. In a pre-Magdalenian context 27 hand stencils in red, red dots, and simple animal paintings in red were found throughout the Lower Gallery. The Middle Magdalenian paintings and remains of residential structures were found near the entrance to this section of the cave. A vertical bison representation from Zone IX was directly dated to around 16,512-17,238 BP.

=== La Garma C and D ===
La Garma C and D are situated above La Garma A and contain burials from the Chacolithic.

=== El Truchiro Cave ===
El Truchiro Cave lies at 39 m (128 ft) above sea level and contains Mesolithic and Chacolithic layers. A late Mesolithic burial dating to around 5560–5310 BC was discovered, with an individual buried in an oak bark coffin.

== Special findings ==
=== Cave lion remains ===
Nine distal phalanxes (claws) from an adult Panthera spelaea were discovered in the Lower Gallery. One of the claws was directedly dated and yields a date of around 14,800 BC. The cave lion fossils came from a smaller specimen of Eurasian cave lions that was common in Cantabria. The claws show signs similar to those made by modern hunters when skinning an animal to preserve its pelt. Since no other cave lion fossil elements were discovered, researchers believe that the fossil claws are the remains of a pelt from a cave lion skinned by the inhabitants of the cave.

=== Portable art ===
La Garma is notable for its rich repository of Magdalenian portable art found in The Lower Gallery. The most outstanding artefact is a backward-facing ibex depiction carved onto a bovine rib spatula. Other portable art elements found at the cave complex include perforated batons, contour découpé, decorated stone plaquettes, and undecorated pendants.

=== Mortuary practices ===
During the Neolithic, La Garma was less and less used as a residential site. From the Chalcolithic through the Bronze Age, it was used primarily as a collective burial site. The peculiar remains of five Visigothic youths were found deep in the cave system. After the bodies had turned into skeletons all of their skulls had been crushed, quite deliberately.

== See also ==
- Caves of Cantabria
