= Cave of El Castillo =

Cave and archaeological site with prehistoric paintings in Spain

- Cueva del Castillo
- Cave of the Castle
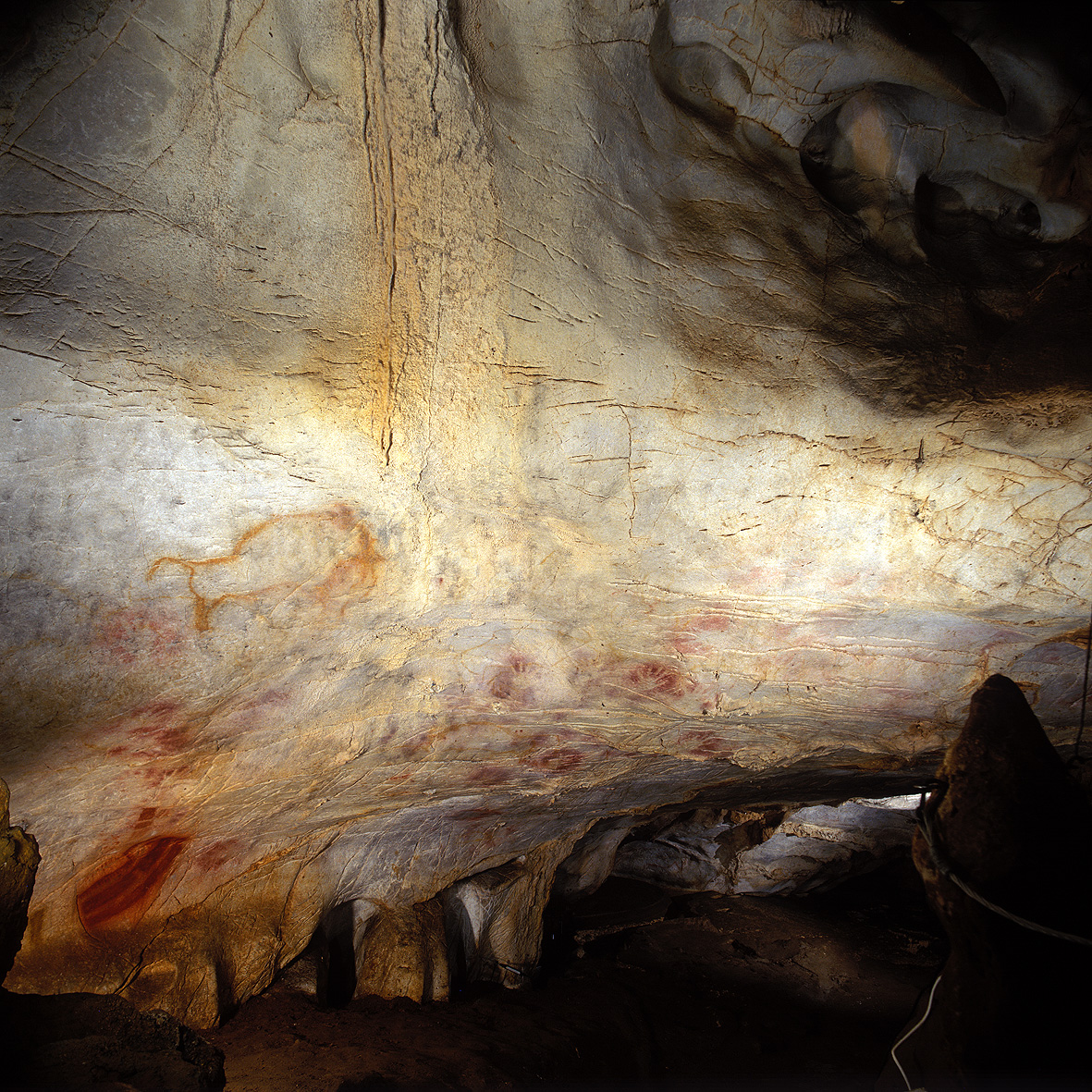
- Main room

- location in Spain Cave of El Castillo (Spain)
- 43°17′32″N 3°57′55″W
- Type: Cave
- Location: Puente Viesgo (Cantabria), Spain
- Part of: Caves of Monte Castillo

UNESCO World Heritage Site
- Official name: Monte Castillo - El Castillo
- Type: Cultural
- Criteria: i, iii
- Designated: 1985 (9th session)
- Part of: Cave of Altamira and Paleolithic Cave Art of Northern Spain
- Reference no.: 310-009
- Region: Europe and North America

Spanish Cultural Heritage
- Official name: Cueva del Castillo
- Type: Non-movable
- Criteria: Monument
- Designated: 25 April 1924
- Reference no.: RI-51-0000267

The Cueva del Castillo contains both a decorated cave and an archaeological site, within the complex of the Caves of Monte Castillo, in Puente Viesgo, Cantabria, Spain.

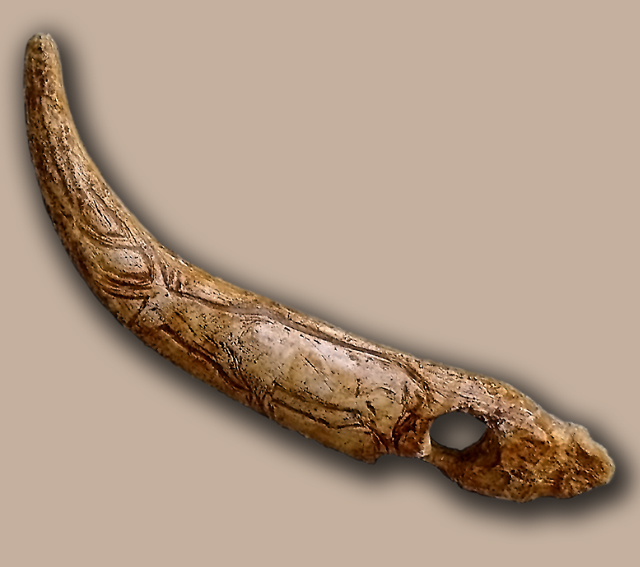
Engraved and perforated stag antler baton (pendant?) of upper Magdalenian age, carved with image of stag

The archaeological stratigraphy has been divided into around 19 layers, depending on the source they slightly deviate from each other, however the overall sequence is consistent, beginning in the Proto-Aurignacian, and ending in the Bronze Age.

El Castillo was discovered in 1903 by Hermilio Alcalde del Río, a Spanish archaeologist, who was one of the pioneers in the study of the earliest cave paintings of Cantabria. The entrance to the cave was smaller in the past and has been enlarged as a result of archaeological excavations. Alcalde del Río found an extensive sequence of images executed in charcoal and red ochre on the walls and ceilings of multiple caverns.

The authors of the first monograph (H. Alcalde del Rio, H. Breuil, L. Sierra, Les cavernes de la région cantabrique (Espagne), Monaco, 1911) catalogued about 200 motifs.

In 2012, uranium-thorium datings on discs of the cave have given dates older than 40,000 years. This could be consistent with the tradition of cave painting originating in the Proto-Aurignacian, with the first arrival of anatomically modern humans in Europe. These results are still subject to debates.

A 2013 study of finger length ratios in Upper Paleolithic hand stencils found in France and Spain determined that the majority were of female hands, overturning the previous widely held belief that this art form was primarily a male activity.

Numerous attempts have been made to determine an individual's sex based on the Manning index. According to this study, the ratio between the length of the index finger and the ring finger indicates a difference between the two sexes (approximately 1 for women and 0.9 for men). This ratio, calculated on current populations, has been applied to Palaeolithic negative handprints. However, the validity of anthropological methods is now debated by many researchers, which means that this type of approach must be treated with caution.

In their complete study of the cave (2003–2023), Marc & Marie-Christine Groenen have identified 2,698 motifs and archaeological evidence, among them 541 figurative motifs (475 animals, 3 composite animals, 21 humans, 1 composite human, 1 imaginary creature, 40 projectiles), 924 non figurative motifs (834 elementary tracings, 90 complex tracings), 884 marks, 84 handprints, 118 archaeological evidence and 17 lithophones.

== See also ==
- Art of the Upper Paleolithic
- List of Stone Age art
- Cave of La Pasiega
