= Cave of Chufín =

Cave and archaeological site with prehistoric paintings in Spain

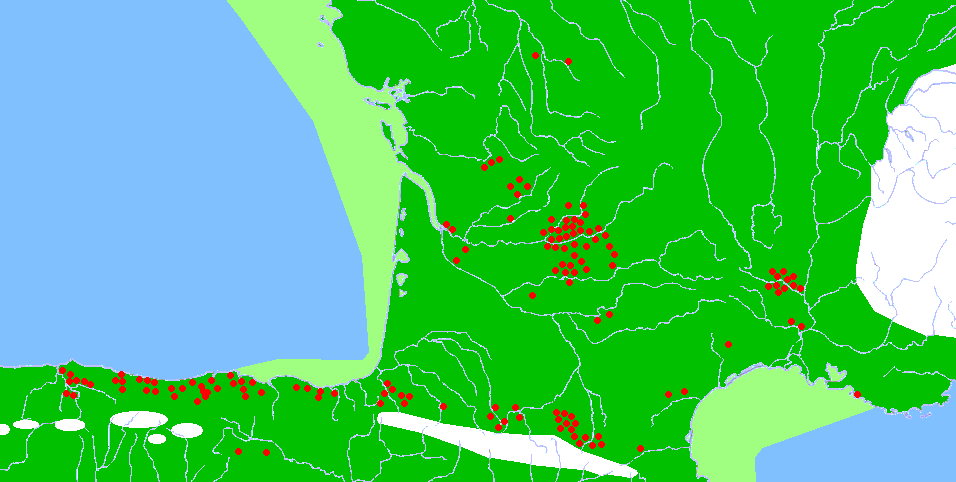
- Interactive map of Cave of Chufín
- 43°17′26″N 4°27′29″W
- Location: Rionansa (Cantabria), Spain

UNESCO World Heritage Site
- Official name: Chufín
- Type: Cultural
- Criteria: i, iii
- Designated: 1985 (9th session)
- Part of: Cave of Altamira and Paleolithic Cave Art of Northern Spain
- Reference no.: 310-007
- Region: Europe and North America
- Buffer zone: 16.65 ha (41.1 acres)

Spanish Cultural Heritage
- Official name: Cueva del Chufin y Chufin IV
- Type: Non-movable
- Criteria: Monument
- Designated: 27 March 2000
- Reference no.: RI-51-0010522

The cave of Chufín is located in the town of Riclones in Rionansa (Cantabria), Spain. Situated at the confluence of the Lamasón and Nansa rivers, several caves ornamented with rock art pock the steep slopes above the water. Chufín is one of the caves included in UNESCO’s list of World Heritage sites under the entry Cave of Altamira and Paleolithic Cave Art of Northern Spain

It was discovered by the photographer Manuel de Cos Borbolla, a native of Rabago (Cantabria).

In Chufín were found different levels of occupation, the oldest being around 20000 years old. The small cave has some subtle engravings and paintings of red deer, goats, and cattle, all represented very schematically.

Also found in the cave were many symbols. One group, called type "sticks", accompanies the paintings inside animals. There are also many drawings using points (puntillaje), including one which has been interpreted as a representation of a vulva.

== See also ==
- Art of the Upper Paleolithic
- List of Stone Age art
