= Cave of La Pasiega =

Cave with prehistoric paintings in Spain

- Cueva de La Pasiega (Spanish)
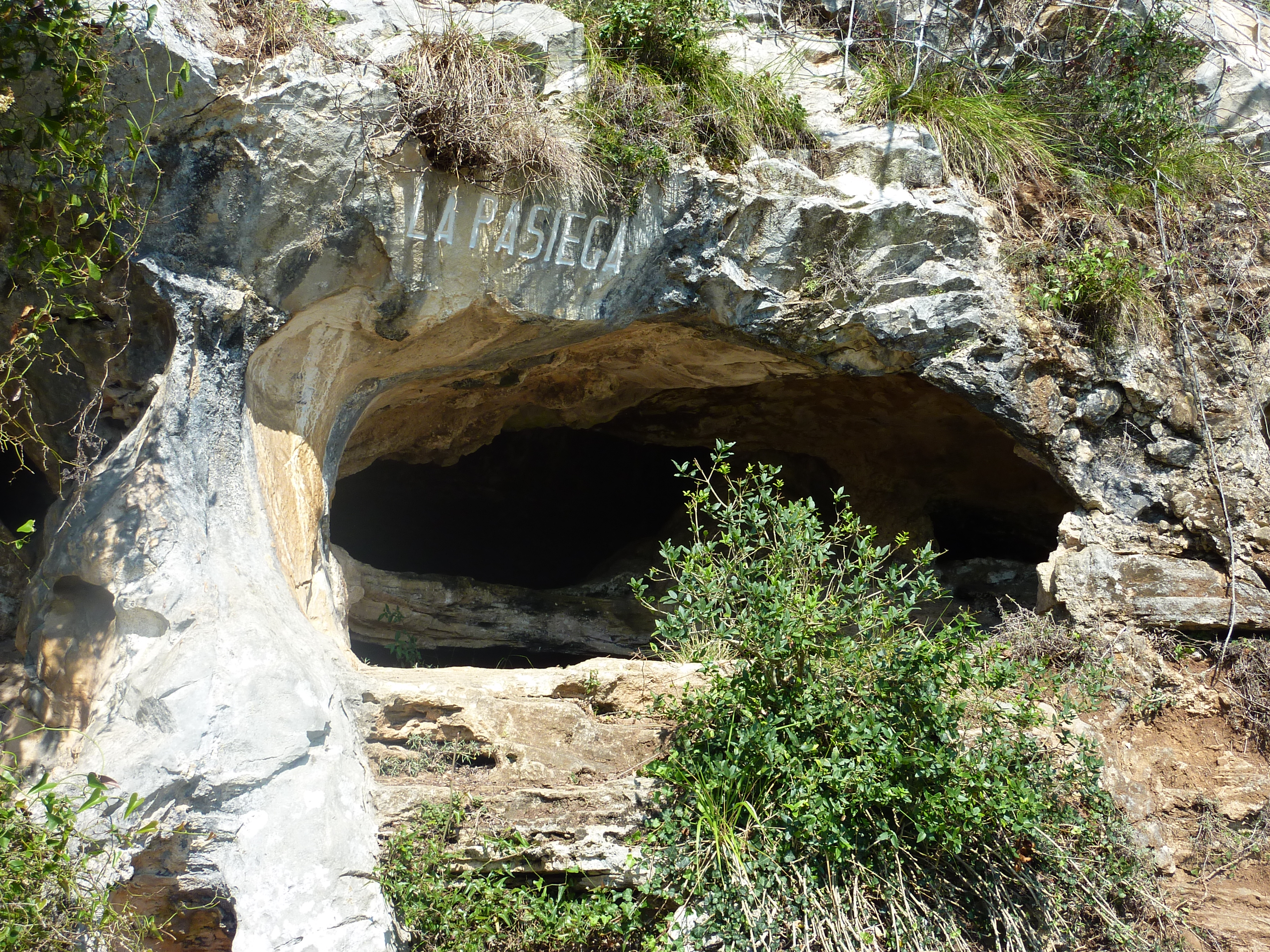
- Cave of La Pasiega

- Location in Spain Cave of La Pasiega (Spain)
- 43°17′20″N 3°57′56″W
- Location: Puente Viesgo (Cantabria), Spain
- Part of: Caves of Monte Castillo

UNESCO World Heritage Site
- Official name: Monte Castillo - La Pasiega
- Type: Cultural
- Criteria: i, iii
- Designated: 1985 (9th session)
- Part of: Cave of Altamira and Paleolithic Cave Art of Northern Spain
- Reference no.: 310-011
- Region: Europe and North America

Spanish Cultural Heritage
- Official name: Cueva de la Pasiega
- Type: Non-movable
- Criteria: Monument
- Designated: 25 April 1924
- Reference no.: RI-51-0000269

Cueva de La Pasiega, or Cave of La Pasiega, situated in the Spanish municipality of Puente Viesgo, is one of the most important monuments of Paleolithic art in Cantabria. It is included in the UNESCO World Heritage List since July 2008, as part of the inscription: Cave of Altamira and Paleolithic Cave Art of Northern Spain.

The cave is located in the heart of the uniprovincial community, in the middle of the Pas River valley, around the cave of Hornos de la Pena and Monte Castillo, in the same group of caves as Las Monedas, Las Chimeneas, and the cave of El Castillo. The caves of Monte Castillo form an amazingly complete series, both as regards the material culture of the Old Stone Age and from an artistic point of view. La Pasiega is basically an enormous gallery, its known extent more than 120 meters, that runs more or less parallel to the slope of the mount, opening to the surface at six different places: six small mouths, the majority obstructed, of which two can be accessed for inspection. The principal gallery is approximately 70 meters and opens to deeper secondary galleries, winding and labyrinthine, which in places broaden out to form large chambers. Thus one refers to "room II-VIII", the room called "Gallery B", or "room 11" of "Gallery C", all with Paleolithic decorations.

The recorded remains belong mainly to the Upper Solutrean and the Lower Magdalenian ages, although older objects are also found. In 2018 uranium-thorium dating claimed to reveal a scalariform (ladder shaped) symbol to be older than 64,000 years and therefore imply it was made by Neanderthals rather than modern humans. This dating, and the possibility of Neanderthal cave art, is disputed on the physical-chemical evidence.

Throughout the cave are many 'walls' with paintings and with engraved or incised images. There are representations of equines (horses), cervids (deer, male and female) and bovines (cattle). There are also many abstract symbols (idiomorphs), suggesting patterns of repeated characters.

== Discovery ==
The scientific discovery of the La Pasiega can be credited to Werner and Hugo Obermaier. While excavating the Cave of El Castillo in 1911, they received news that the workers knew of another cavity nearby, which villagers called "La Pasiega." The investigators soon confirmed that the cave contained rock paintings. Later, Henri Breuil, Hugo Obermaier, and Hermilio Alcalde del Río began their systematic study of the cave. However, the study could not be finished due to Henri Breuil's ongoing work on his magnum opus. A separate monograph was necessary, and was published in 1913. (Note: Both publications were issued in Monaco because it was Prince Alberto I of Monaco who was patron of the investigations, ever since he had visited the site in 1909. He was a great lover of archaeology, supported this excavation and others greatly, and one of the fossil humans is named in his honour "Grimaldi Man", one of many names given to Homo sapiens fossilis).) The study was crucial to advance prehistoric science in Spain.

"In the next decade, Alcalde del Río was to assist fully in the international project that the Institut de paléontologie humaine in París sponsored, in which Abbé Breuil and H. Obermaier were prominent. That is the period in which the cave of La Pasiega was discovered. This is the most important moment in the study of Cantabrian rock art. The fruits of this labour were to feature in the monumental joint publications on the caves of the region, issued in Monaco, in the general work (Alcalde del Río, Breuil and Sierra, 1911), and specifically on La Pasiega (Breuil, Obermaier and Alcalde del Río, 1913)" — Joaquín González Echegaray

In 1903 Alcalde del Río had discovered the cave El Castillo, and, as noted, Obermaier carried out excavations between 1910 and 1914. The excavations were continued at various times, intermittently, until our own times, by qualified specialists. Ultimately the investigation was taken up by the archaeologists Rodrigo de Balbín Behrmann and César González Sainz. After the discovery of "La Pasiega" and the first campaigns, the area was little visited — mainly owing to the difficult historical circumstances of Spain in the 1930s. After this, in 1952, while a eucalyptus plantation was being put in, another cave was found with a small monetary treasure of the 17th century: hence the new cave was called "Las Monedas": in it, however, was found a rock sanctuary with important pictures and drawings. In light of this, the engineer Alfredo García Lorenzo concluded that Monte Castillo held more secrets. Therefore, a geological survey was set in motion which resulted the following year in the discovery of another cave with rock paintings, "Las Chimeneas" ("The Chimneys"), and also other covachas of lesser importance such as "La Flecha", "Castañera", "Lago" etc.

== Other archaeologists ==
The cave, because it had remains of the primary Cantabrian Solutrean and Magdalenian epochs, provided the basis for a chronological series for the 'wall' paintings. The excavations were old, most recently conducted by Dr. Jesus Carballo in 1951. There was a base level with ambiguous artefacts which, by their characteristics, seemed related to a possible Mousterian phase. Above that there rested a comparatively rich Solutrean level with very characteristic implements such as 'feuilles de laurier' (leaf-points) and notched points with the finest working produced by light pressure-flaking, like light javelin points. This level could be attributed accurately to the Upper Solutrean. The most recent layer was also relatively rich, with various burins (borers), striker pins, and perforated objects of bone and that could belong to the Lower Magdalenian. Certainly, compared with the stratigraphical significance of El Castillo, La Pasiega is an archeological sequence of less organization, so far as the materials yet found are concerned. (Note: This evaluation carries the caveat that it depends on the archaic system of excavation which existed in Spain in the 1950s and before. In fact it is a notorious and proven fact that in the spoil-heaps of those old works carried out at Monte Castillo, one can find discarded specimens which are really objects of archaeological importance.) However they should certainly not be less valued for this.

== Cave paintings ==
On the plan proposed by André Leroi-Gourhan, La Pasiega can be taken as a good example of the "Cave as Sanctuary", or to be more precise as a collection of sanctuaries of different epochs, arranged according to certain models. In fact this idea developed in the thoughts of the distinguished French prehistorian precisely when he visited the Cantabrian caves, while he was participating in a group of foreign investigators who were excavating in the cave of El Pendo during the 1950s. "I can definitely confirm that the study of the rock art of northern Spain was decisive in the master's ideas, which since then have become famous through his many publications." For Leroi-Gourhan, this type of cave has a rather complex spatial or topographical hierarchy in which it is possible to discern principal groups of animals (bos facing equus, forming a duality), which occupy the most conspicuous or preferred areas, complemented by secondary animals (deer, goat, etc.) and other more occasional species which however fulfil their subsidiary function: on the other hand it is usual that the idiomorphic symbols appear in peripheral or marginal areas, or in those which are difficult to reach:

Animals and symbols correspond, therefore, to the same basic formulae, logically binary and even defended by the fact that animals of the same species appear frequently in pairs, male and female, though the dispositivo is so complex that we ought not suppose an explanation purely based in the symbolism of fertility; the first element is the presence of two species A-B (horse-bison); confronted with two types of signs, masculine and feminine, an attempt to attribute to the horse and bison the same symbolic value or, at least, a bivalency of the same kind as that of the symbols of the two categories (S1 and S2)

It is supposed that there are exceptions to this rule, many variants which depend on regions and epochs, the significance of which is not entirely clear in its general outline, but which should be explained in a particular way, also at La Pasiega.

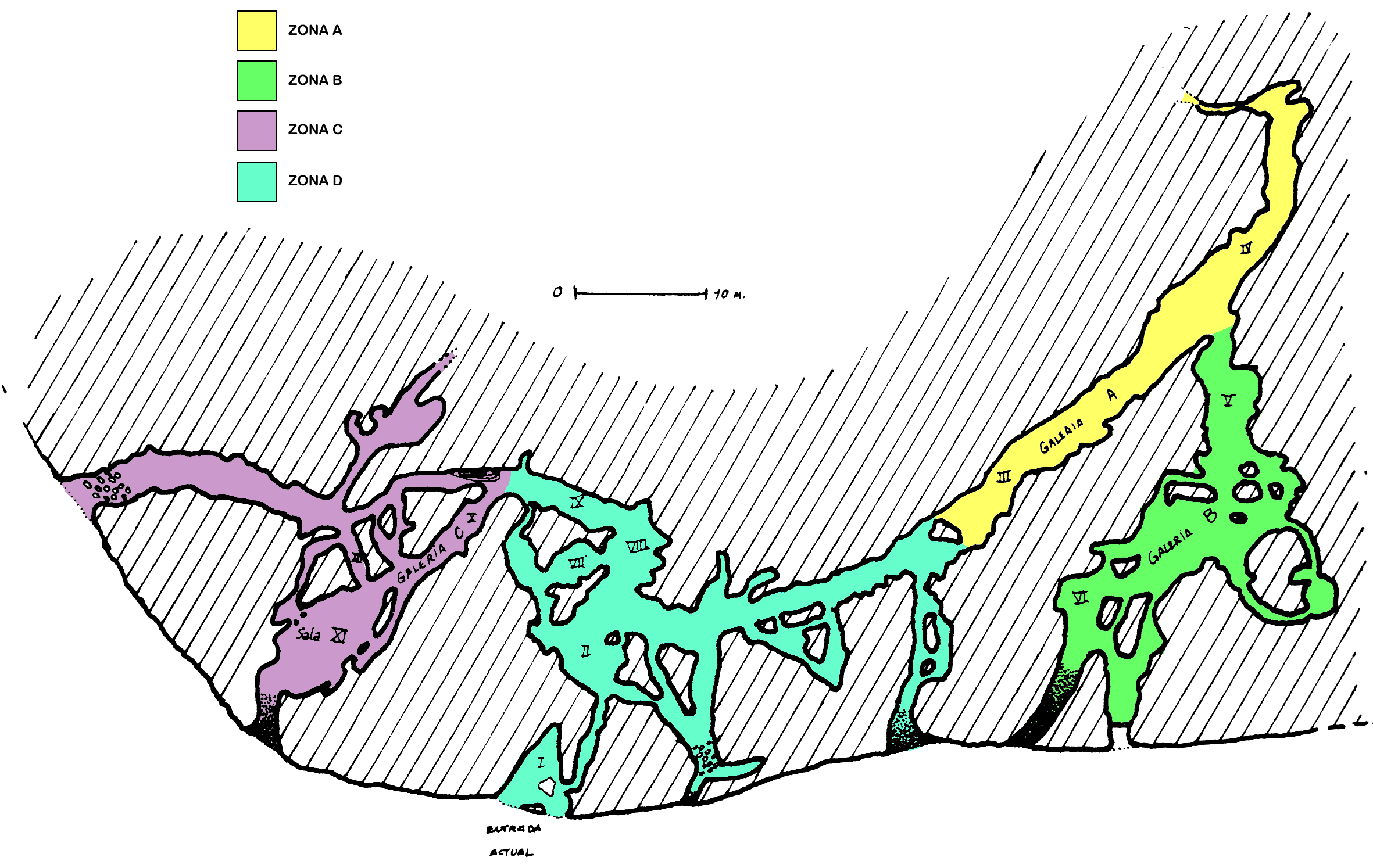
General plan of the cave of La Pasiega

Joaquín González Echegaray and later his fellow-workers have made various counts of the species of animal represented, one of which reckoned more than 700 painted forms in this cave, among others: 97 deer (69 females and 28 males), 80 horses, 32 ibex, 31 cattle (17 bison and 14 aurochs), two reindeer, a carnivorous animal, a chamois, a megaloceros, a bird and a fish; also there may be a mammoth and about 40 quadrupeds not clearly identified; also the idiomorphs, such as roof-shaped and other surprisingly varied symbols (more than 130), and very often including various anthropomorphs and hundreds of marks and partly erased traces.

=== Gallery A, 1st Sanctuary ===
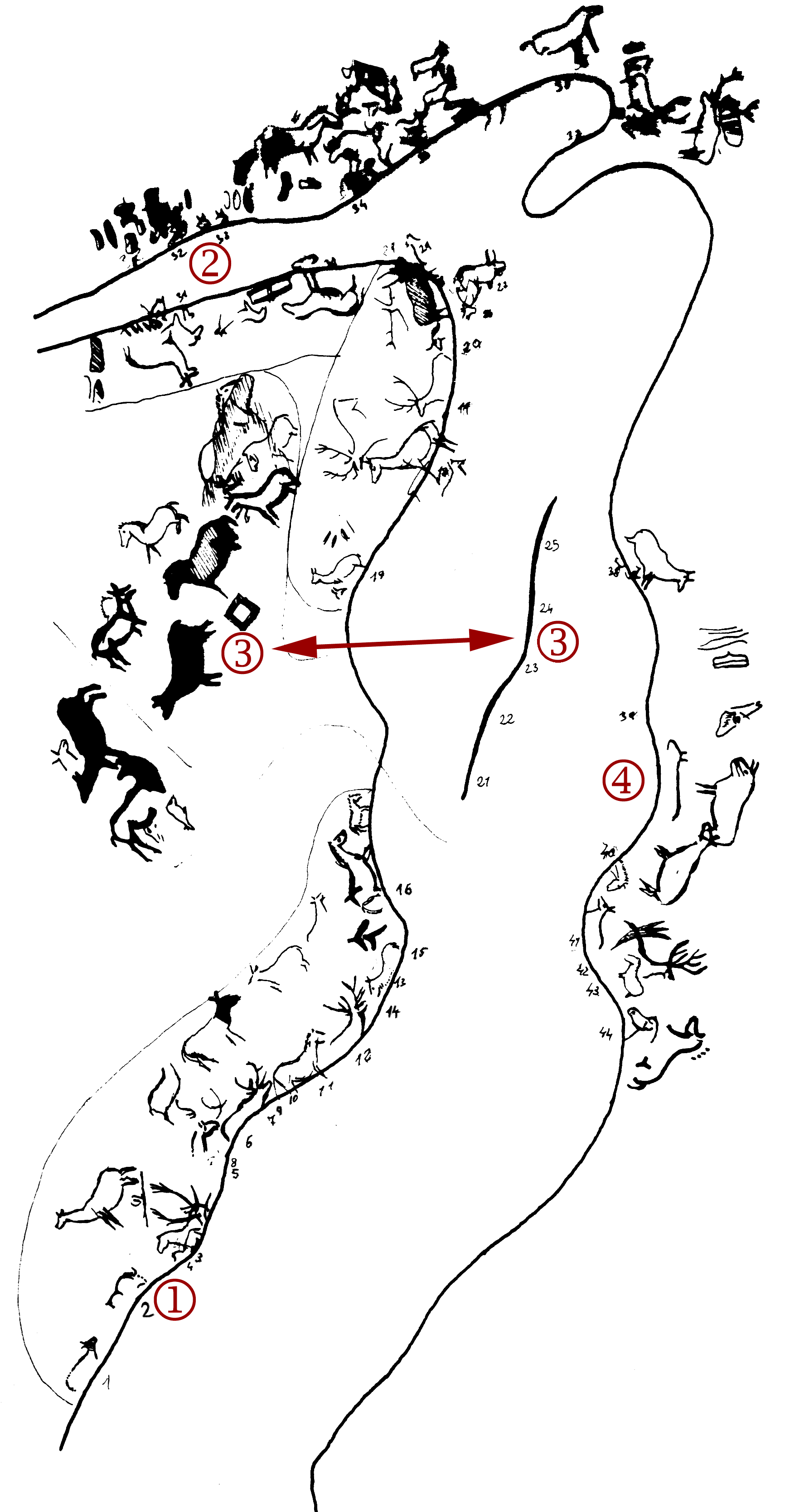
Plan and layout of the rock images of Gallery A, 1st Sanctuary

To get into Gallery A it is necessary to descend by a little well, but originally one could go in by another entrance which, however, is now thoroughly blocked by stalactites and by collapses from outside. The gallery runs to a depth of 95 meters (from the present entrance), but it gets narrower and it is not possible to know whether it continues beyond. Entering into the cave, one passes a blocked entrance on the right, and between 60 and 70 meters depth appears the connection to Gallery B, slightly before the most interesting collection of pictures.

Then at a bit more than 75 meters it seems that the sanctuary (properly so-called) begins, with more than 50 deer (the majority female), the horses about half that number, and the cattle (aurochs and bison) fewer, strategically placed dominating the most visible places. In this sanctuary there have been found an anthropomorph, a vulva, linear and dotted symbols, a square and a great quantity of tectiforms, about as many as the deer.

The paintings can be put together in various groups, paying attention, above all, to dating criteria, but also technical and thematic sequence which unfolds like clockwork. These groups seem schematized with the semiotic zoological conventions unravelled by Leroi-Gourhan. (Note: Leroi-Gourhan, 'Consideraciones sobre la organización espacial de las figuras animales en el arte parietal paleolítico', in Símbolos, Artes y Creencias de la Prehistoria (Editorial Istmo, Madrid 1984), p.: 453) identifies the figures of animals and signs with the following notation: A: Horse; B: Cattle; B_{1}: Bison; B_{2}: Aurochs; C: Peripheral animals; C_{1}: Deer; C_{2}: Mammoth; C_{3}: Ibex; C_{4}: Reindeer; Others are: P: Fish; S: Sign; S_{1}: Sign signifying male; S_{2}: Sign signifying female; M: Hand or sign in the form of a hand; H: Male anthropomorph; F: Female anthropomorph; ?: Figure or mark (not identified))

The First Large Group is on the left hand wall of the gallery, including figures arranged as a double frieze with numerous deer, mostly female, and also plenty of horses and a bison which is at the centre of the composition. Between them are symbols which stress the association of the vulva and the rod, the male-female distinction. The group brings out the theme of Bison-Horse which can also be interpreted as the same type of dualism. The group is completed by another little group of horses, the remaining animals being in the centre and the upper part of the frieze, where there are only hinds and idiomorphs.

Grouping arrangement, First Group, Gallery A

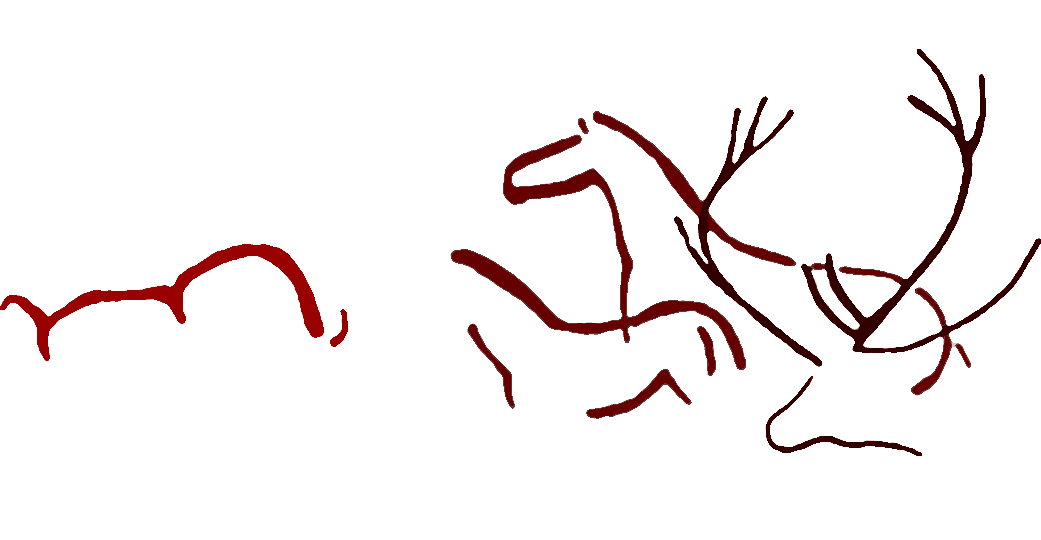
The bison–horse opposition (with a giant deer), from the First Group, Gallery A

The techniques of execution include outlines for hinds and bison, linear drawing (between outline and modelling) and, only in two places, partial tinta plana (selective infilling) is used (for the heads of certain hinds). The dominant color, without any doubt, is red, but in a small way yellow and purplish red also appear. Engraving was not used in this group.

After this one finds a series of groupings of less organization, more or less connected with these, on the left wall of the gallery: in them appear every kind of figure that, certainly, complement the following group. They are clearly dominated by deer in association with some idiomorphs and a few cattle (possibly aurochs), which seem to stand in relation to the horses in the group which next appears round a corner.

The Second Large Group begins around a bend to the left, in the end area of the gallery, where it becomes narrow: it brings together figures on one side and the other. This time the horses and the deer are almost equal in number, as usual at La Pasiega, and fewer but not less important are the cattle, two of which are bison. Also there is a possible feminine anthropomorph and about thirty rectangular tectiform symbols, positioned in the way that seems to be usual in this type of cave sanctuary:

"The symbols, in general, occupy a separate space from the animals, either in the borders of the panels, or running into a niche or hollow, or a cranny more or less nearby. Even so, there are reasons to think that the signs are placed in relation to the same animals."

The cattle are concentrated on the right side, together with three of the horses, forming the nucleus of the binary dialectic arrangement of this second group, and moreover, there is also included with them the anthropomorph, all surrounded by the typical peripheral animals (deer) and idiomorphs. On the left wall, together with more deer, the other five horses which apparently stand in binary relation to the cattle painted before the bend, which have been mentioned in the earlier description. At the end of the gallery, which is starting to turn into a narrow defile, there are rectangular signs on either side.

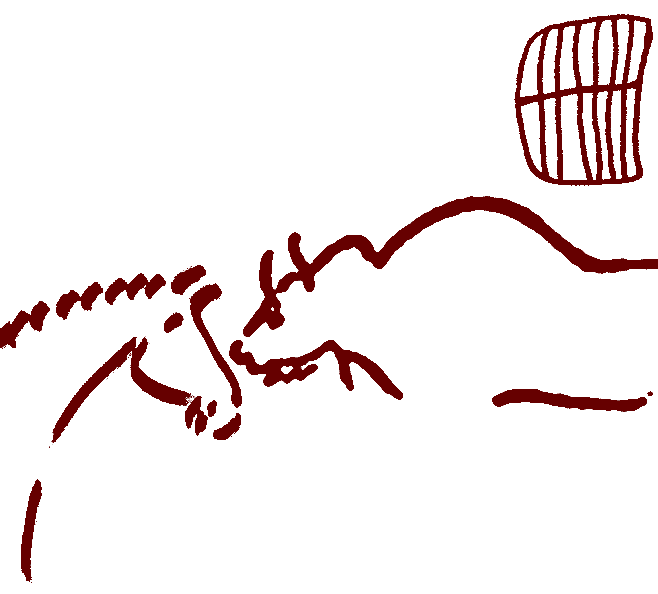
The bison–horse confrontation (complemented by a tectiform sign, from the 'Second Group' of Gallery A

Grouping formula of the Second Group, Gallery A

Nearby, in a little recess there is a third group of lesser extent. In this are five deer, an ibex and a bovid, all complemented by seven quadrangular signs, one of them shaped like the segment of an orange. The arrangement seems clear in principle: the pictures of the two walls form two confrontations, on one side the bovid with some deer and idiomorphic signs; this confronts the horses which, in this way, align themselves with the bison, and the rest of the deer, the signs, and the goat.

All this large complex of paintings is predominantly in modeled outline drawing in red.

The Third Large Group is sited on a stalagmite formation which hangs from the vault (such as has the speleological name bandera), between the first group already described and the last, which will be described below. The two groups, although they are near to one another, are executed in a different technique (Note: The article refers to these groups of different method in order to give weight of attention, by their physical nearness, to their different techniques of execution.) giving rise to the suspicion that they were created in different periods. There are about ten hinds, also several horses (though not so many), two cattle and a square symbol. Coming from the entrance direction, one sees first most of the hinds, followed by the association of the horses, below which are the symbol and the remaining hinds.

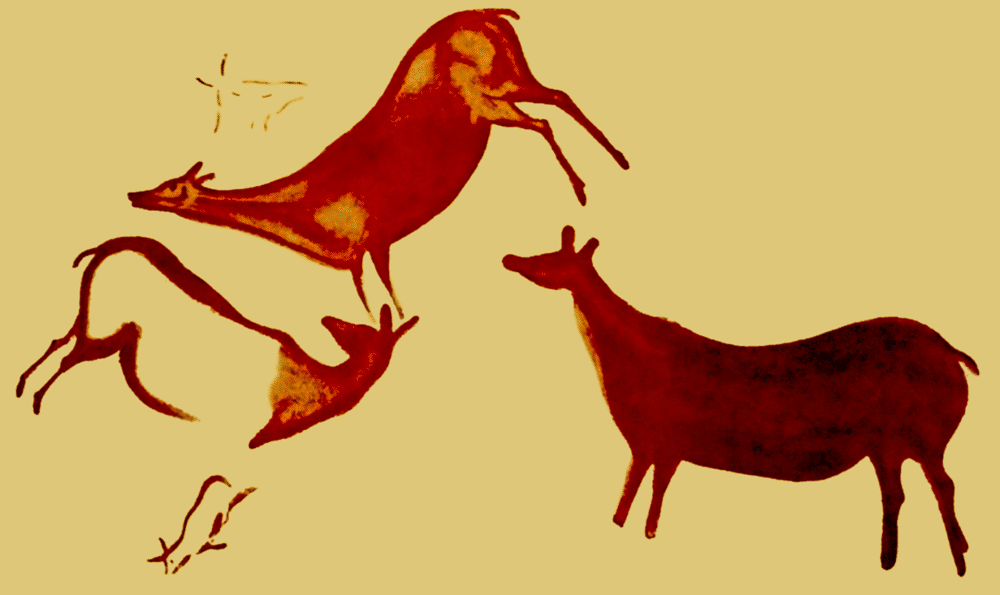
Hinds painted in red in 'tinta plana', Third Group, Gallery A

Grouping formula, 3rd Group, Gallery A

Grouping formula, 4th Group, Gallery A

The predominant technique, for its warmth and for its frequency of use, is the tinta plana - the plane or block color – either combined with black lines forming an outline in a sort of two-color method (as occurs on one of the horses), or emphasized with engraved lines which define details (this can be seen on various hinds), or enclosed, with scraffito in the rock to add chiaroscuro textures, as happens with a hind painted in red. Three of the horses and the head of another are black, the square sign is yellow, and the remainder of the figures are red.

The Fourth (and last) Large Group, placed facing the group just described, is in a very close relationship to it, containing a similar number of deer and horses, together with a pair of bison. Among the various symbols an idiomorph in the shape of a hand is prominent, reminiscent of those at Santián, and a red sign which could well be meant for a grotesque bison head. In the central position appear a horse and a bison, forming the typical binary combination, at one end other bison and at the opposite end the remaining horses. There is no tinta plana, no engraving and no two-color work: on the contrary, it is predominantly (more or less modeled) outline work in red.

=== Gallery B, 2nd Sanctuary ===
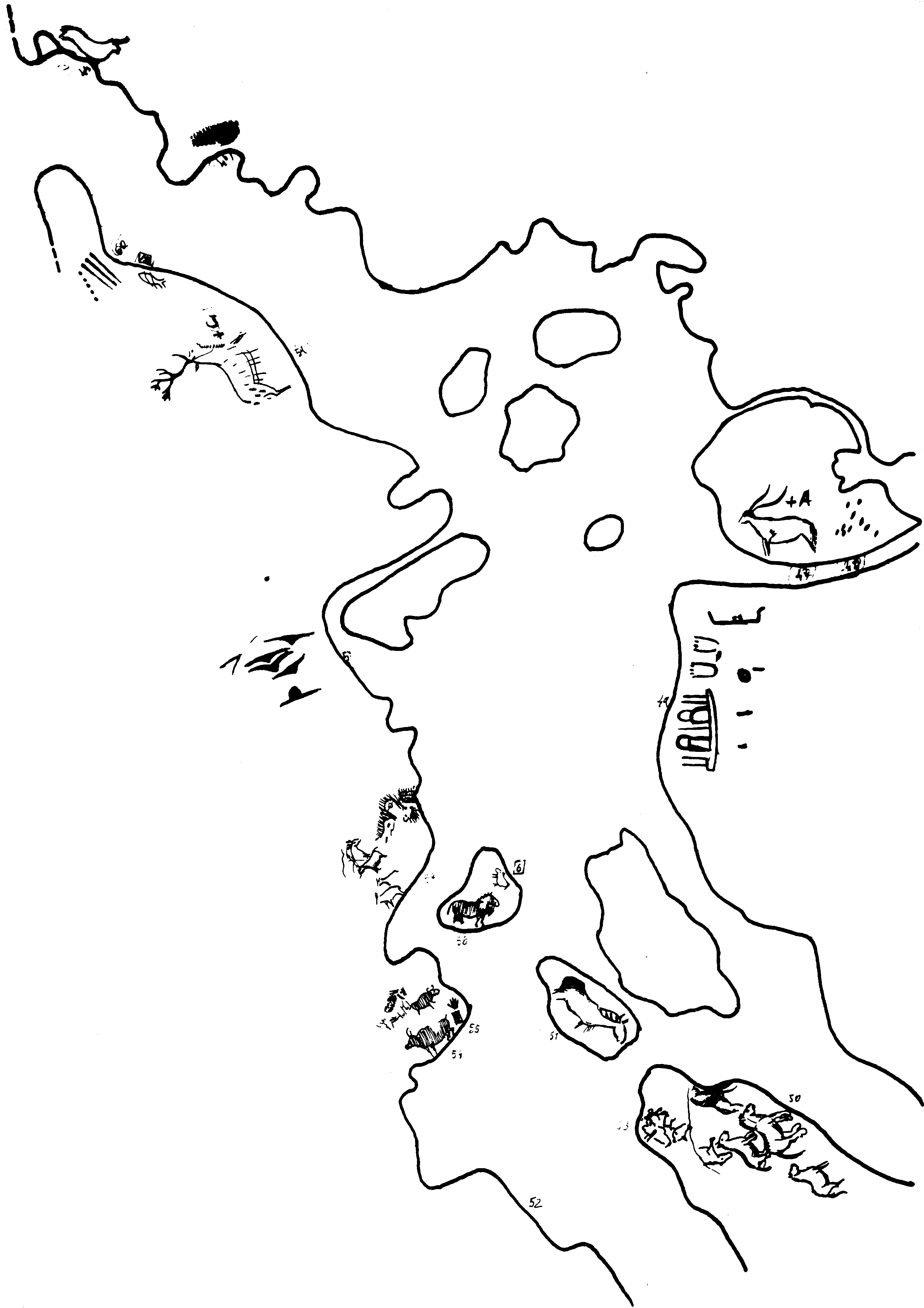
Plan and schema of the rock paintings of Gallery B, 2nd Sanctuary

Entering through Gallery A, after 60 or 70 meters, through a tunnel on the right, the first big room of Gallery B is met with. Fairly far away from the entrance which is used nowadays there are various old exits to the exterior which have become blocked with the passage of time. One of them has been made into an opening, but it is not known whether, in the epoch in which this area was decorated, any of these were usable, which would be a help in understanding the point of view which the prehistoric artists would have taken in conceptualizing the zonal arrangement and levels of the room's decoration. (Note: Above this lack of information, the contents are limited to the present condition of the cave. A second problem concerns the available material which has not been described in Gallery A, being in that case the figures shown in the monograph (Breuil, Obermaier y Alcalde Del Río, op. cit, 1913) shown on unassociated sheets, out of context, in a way that one cannot reconstruct how to obtain a realistic idea of the complete arrangement of the panels. The inventory tells of the cumulative effect but not the numerical proportions of their composition. This problem recurs in the pictorial groups of Gallery C. Nor is there a detailed study of the structure of the panels of the annex room discovered in 1964 by Joaquín González Echegaray and Eduardo Ripoll Perelló (1964): 'Nuevos grabados y pinturas en las cuevas del Monte Castillo', in Zephyrus, Revista de Prehistoria y Arqueología, vol. XV, Nº Universidad de Salamanca. ISSN 0514-7336.)

The pictorial density of this room is less than in Gallery A, with which it is partly to be associated. Among its depictions there is a roughly equal number of deer and horses, with a lesser number of cattle, following the customary pattern of this cave. But it is outstanding for the originality of some of its other figures, including a fish, a large ibex and idiomorphs like rods, key-shapes and an unprecedented little group of symbols popularly known as "The Inscription".

Panel 53

Panels 54 and 55

Panel 57

So far as it has been possible to observe, the arrangement of all these figures amounts to a careful scheme of introduction to the main panels of Gallery A, supposing that this might have been the main entrance. At the entry (from Gallery A) is a little engraved hind, and later, signs of the kind named alfa by Leroi-Gourhan (that is to say, masculine), which appear on both sides of the gallery. Following the constructed entrance, on the right appears a fish, followed by a large male deer (stag) together with a little hind (both in black). Immediately before reaching the centre of the large room there appear signs on both sides, but this time they are of the beta type (feminine), red in color. The crowning feature of this sanctuary consists of three groups or panels which repeat the scheme of cattle-horse complemented by secondary animals or without them. There are three other panels in which only horses appear, several of them on the same stalagmite columns, others on the walls. In this nucleus a hand in positive depiction is emphasised, not mutilated, but with six fingers!: a grill-shaped symbol, some unidentified animal engraved in striated lines and the only male ibex of the room.

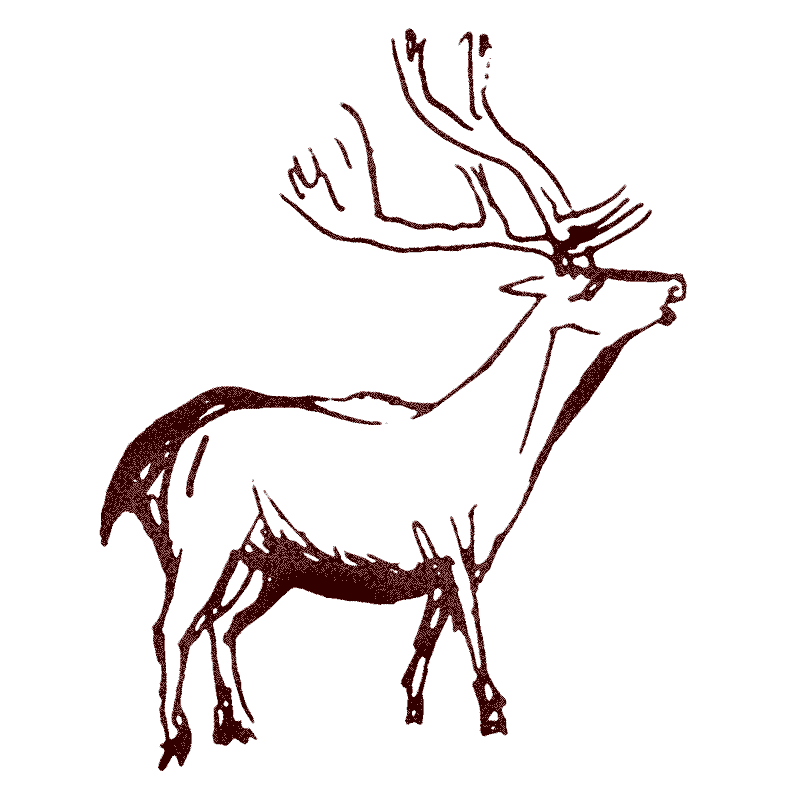
Deer painted in red,
panel 59

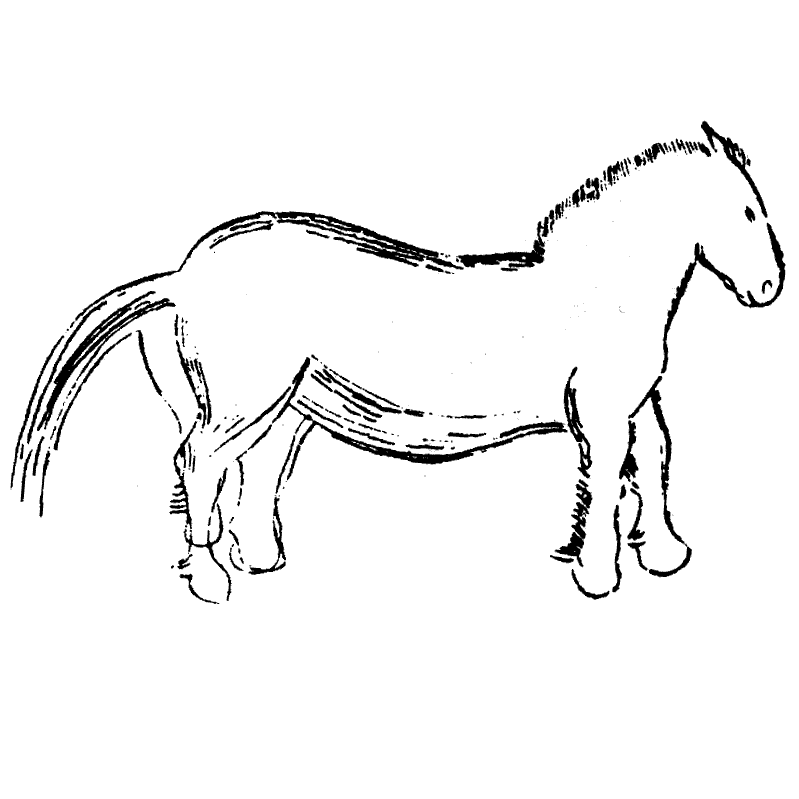
Engraved horse,
panel 50

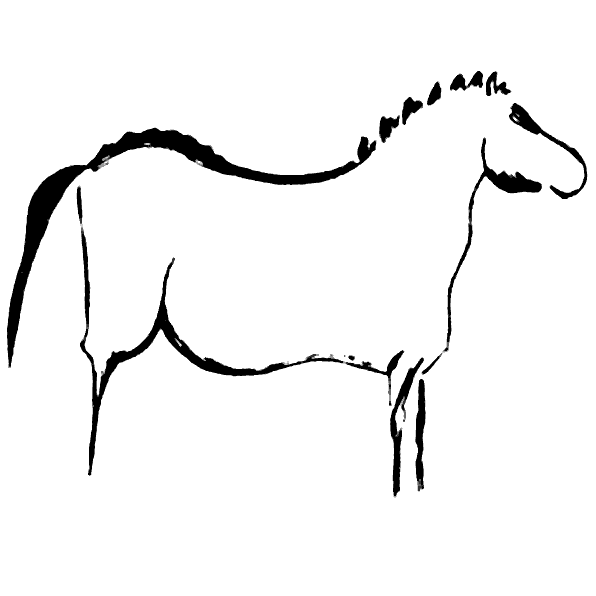
Horse painted in black,
panel 51

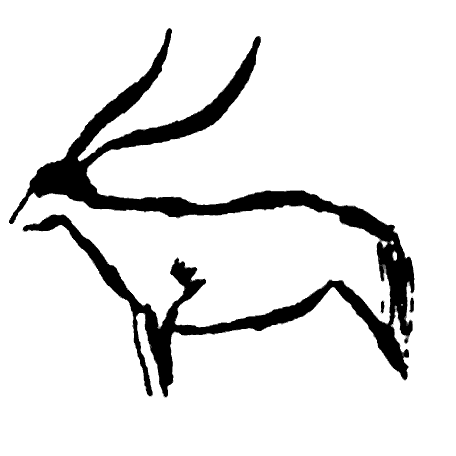
Male ibex painted in black, panel 47

The techniques employed by the painters recall, partly, those of Gallery A (which is why they have come to be considered as related rooms): red painting, between modeled and outline, red block coloring (tinta plana), with some internal modeling achieved by scraffito to the underlying rock and by the addition of lines of the same color but in more intense shades. The most important difference is the copious use of engraving, both simple and striated, applied specially to the horses.

=== Gallery C (room XI), 3rd Sanctuary ===
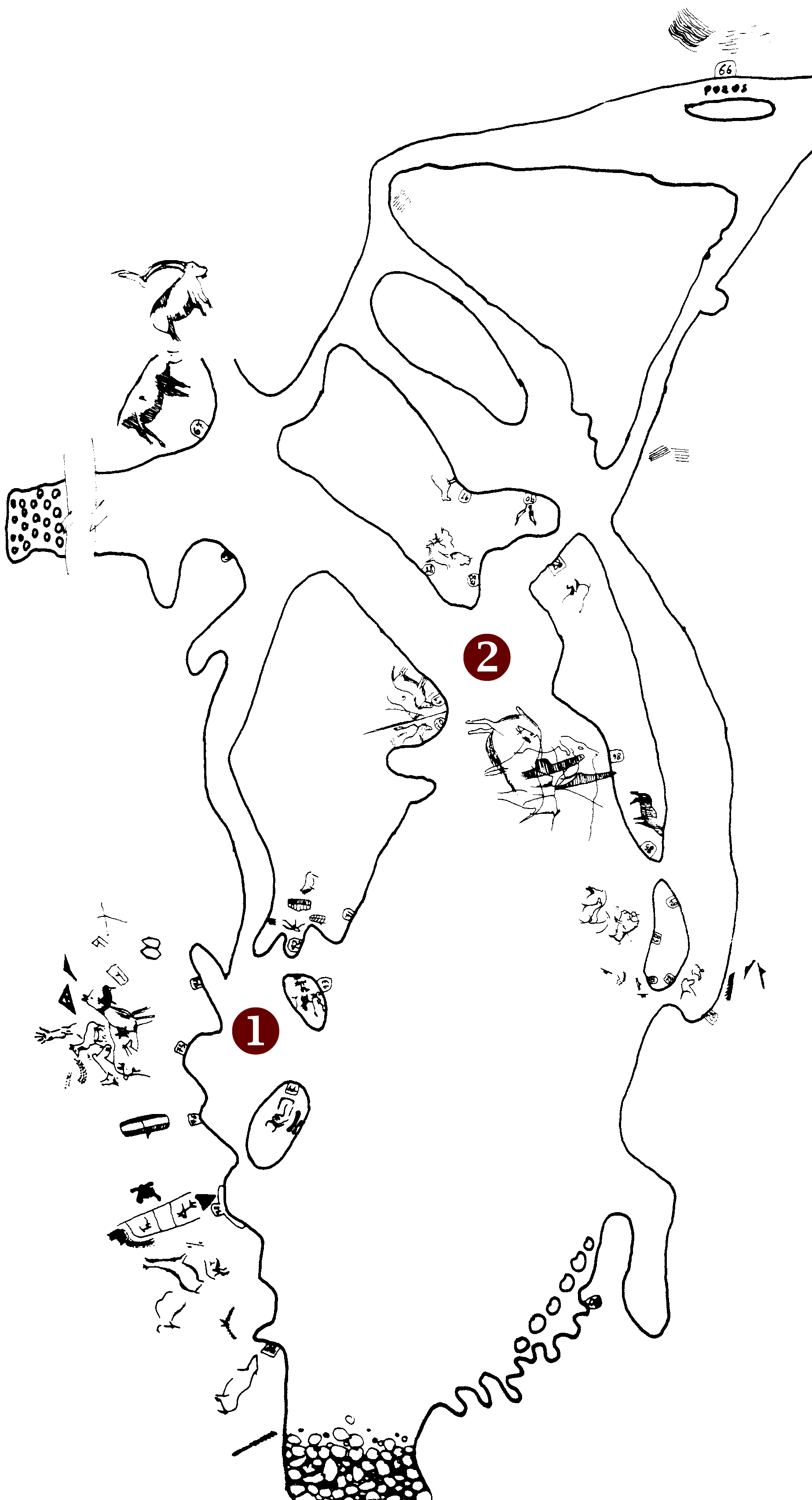
Plan and schema of the rock paintings of Gallery C, 3rd Sanctuary

Access to Gallery C is found, after entering the cave, by a way through to the left crossing Gallery D. Along there opens "Room XI" of Gallery C. This, in the same way as Gallery B, has direct communication with the outside, despite the fact that it is obstructed by rubble and rocks which have certainly been introduced. Once again, the perception of the arrangement of the pictures is changed for the observer by the problem of the blocked entrances, as we have noticed in the second Sanctuary.

Leroi-Gourhan differentiates two clear parts to this sanctuary, located in separate places within the same room, and with different themes, technique and chronology. In addition there are two ibexes in the original monograph indicated at number 67, produced in partial block color by a kind of modeling and black in color, a method which is not found in any of the remaining figures of the room.

The First Large Group of Room XI is the one found mainly around the presumed original entrance, now blocked. It contains mainly hinds, some stags, various cattle and a pair of horses, and also there is a goat. There are other symbols difficult to identify, some seeming to be animals, others anthropomorphs, and there is a positive hand impression colored black, dotted signs, rod signs, and other idiomorphs, among which stands out the so-called "Trampa" (a kind of column which encloses, behind a symbol, a bison and a hind (more will be said of this anon). The arrangement of this group seems to correspond to a threefold or ternary structure with variations: bos-equus-cervus with various signs or bos-equus-anthropomorph with signs. The truth is that the complexity of this panel is great, given the concentration of very varied figures.

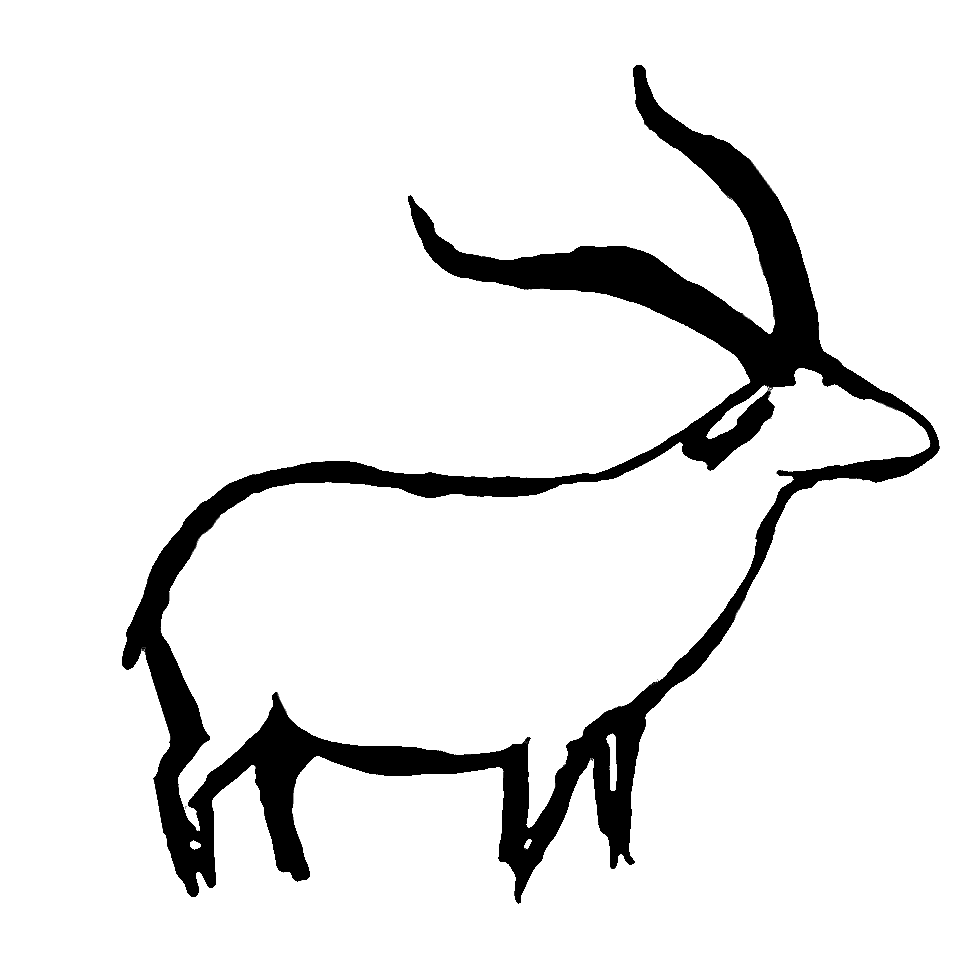
Male ibex painted in black with modeled lines in Gallery C

Scheme of the wall depictions in panel 74-75 of Gallery C

Scheme of the wall depictions of panel 79 of Gallery C

Clearly the dominant technique is red outline drawing, but in one of the panels is also found, for some deer, striated engraving of very fine execution: also, there are various figures in black. In addition, there is two-color work on one of the cattle, in which red block painting and black lines are combined, this time a repainting of different date. The presumed anthropomorph seems to contain up to three colors, not a very usual thing in palaeolithic art (red, black and yellow). There are some yellow figures.

The Second Large Group is around the access area to Zone D, that is, on the opposite side of the room. The species represented show predominantly horses, followed by cattle, and fewer but certainly present are deer and ibex (for which the symbols are complementary to the foregoing group). The symbols are of indeterminate number, and are of distinct kind, including key-shaped and feather-shaped ones, and also barred and dotted ones. The reduction in number of the deer does not happen in any other parts of the cave, where they are in the majority, whereas the proportion of horses is increased.

Scheme of the wall depictions of panel 86 of Gallery C

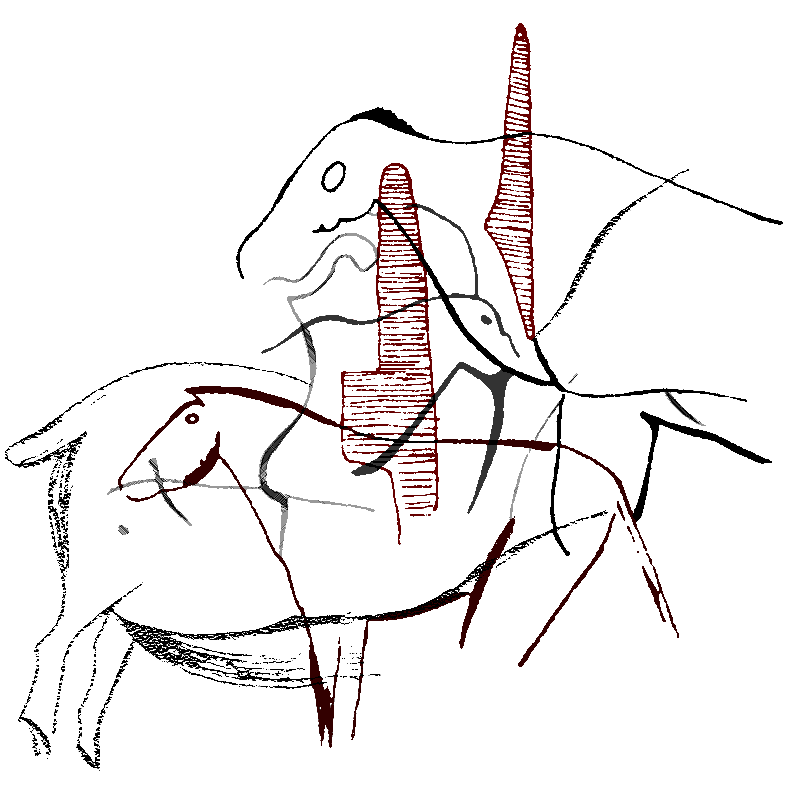
Overlay of painting and engraving,
Gallery C

Scheme of wall depictions of panel 81-83 of Gallery C

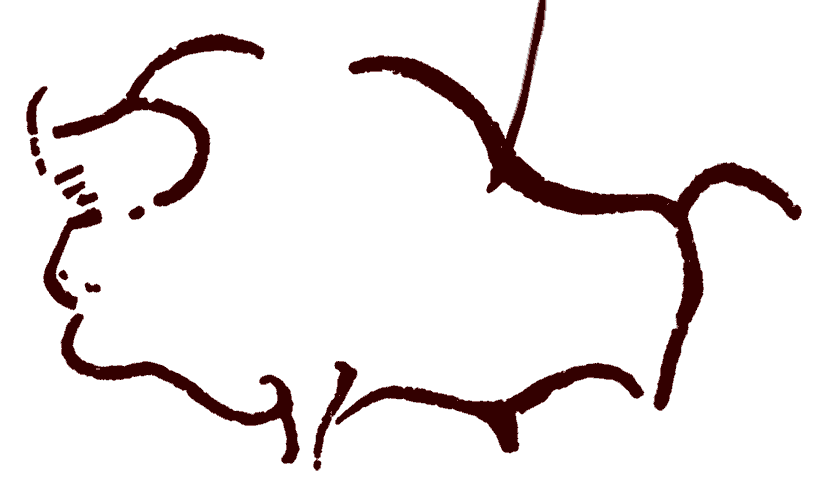
Bison in dark coloration from panel 83,
Gallery

Here the arrangement is also complex. All the idiomorphs are in the area nearest to the cave mouth, and the overlays show repaintings, maybe in distinct periods. There are three possible sub-groups of horses without cattle (only two of the compositions are the typical A-B which have been observed up to this point). However, there are plenty of isolated figures, above all round the entrance to the room from Zone D.

The dominant techniques are engraving of multiple lines, as if striated, and black painting: the yellows, reds and ochres are fewer. However, there is an example of the two-color work, in one representation, although it is not very prominent. As we have seen, the technique is also distinct from that of the earlier group and confirms the separation of the two areas within the room.

=== Zone D ===
This is an intermediate part of the cave, which is probably an extension of the sanctuary of Gallery C, like a 'grey area', with much fewer and more sporadic images among which there is little coherency, apart from a pair of small groups which continue to repeat the theme of the cattle and horse dualism.

=== Differences between the sanctuaries ===
Taken together, one can see clear differences between the various 'sanctuaries'. That of Gallery A, which is the most substantial, has no engraved work apart from a few images in which it is combined with block color painting; on the other hand, tamponado method is very important, combined with other techniques of painting basically in red; the ibex is very scarce, but the deer are almost double in number to the horses and five times more frequent than the cattle. There are many rectangular tectiform idiomorphs.

In Gallery B, which has fewer images, one notices the absence of tamponado, while engraving (simple or striated) gains importance. The deer here are fewer, except in the room which was found in the 1960s; and the idiomorphs are completely different, with the so-called 'inscription' outstanding for its uniqueness.

Gallery C has, so to say, two independent sanctuaries, both with striated engraving, but while the first present images which are mainly red, in the second they are mainly black; here the goats attain an importance not seen in the rest of the cave, and the idiomorphs are fairly unusual, particularly those painted in red.

Although both Gallery A and Gallery C have dual-color work, the methods are different in each case.

== The idiomorphs of La Pasiega ==
The idiomorphs – and possible anthropomorphs – of La Pasiega are listed and classified as:

- Dotted signs: These are the simplest symbols in the cave. Generally they appear in two forms, one of which has many dots, usually not associated with animals, but with other idiomorphs to which they are complementary. They are commonest in Galleries B and C, in the latter the groups of many dots seem related to deer, but the symbols are painted and the animals engraved, from which it is possible to deduce that they are of different periods.
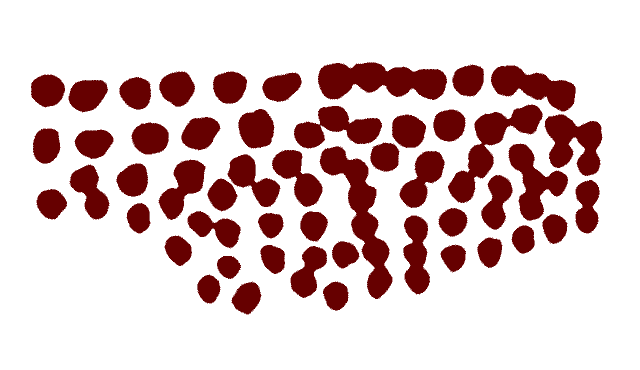
Large group of dots

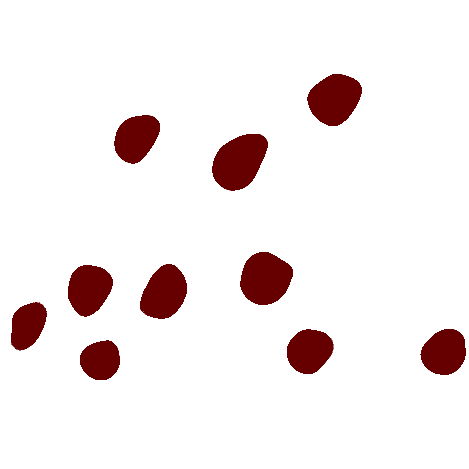
Small group of dots

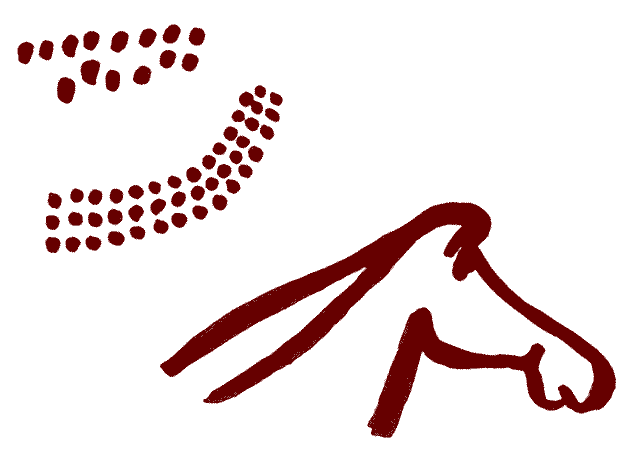
Horse head associated with two large groups of dots

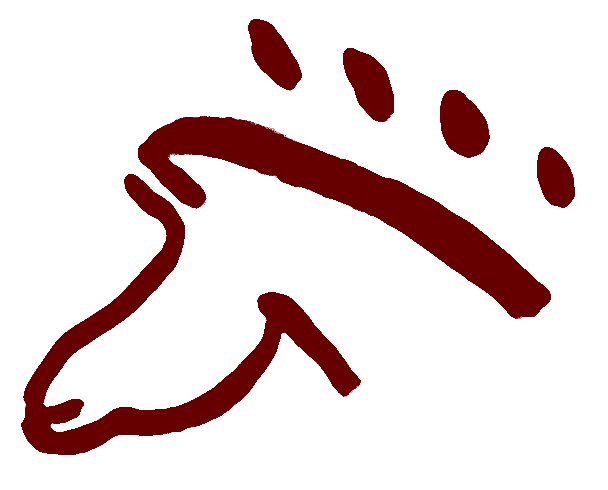
Horse head associated with a small group of dots

In the second type, the dots can appear much more loosely grouped. Then it is certainly possible to associate them with animals without too much uncertainty. The small groups of dots always appear once or twice in each room combined with cattle. But there are two very distinct cases in Gallery A in which horses have an aureole of dots, and these are confronted one to the other as at the entrance to the room mentioned. The dotted forms are most common during the Solutrean period.

- Linear signs: These are more varied and complex both in their morphology and in their associations (there are examples shaped like arrows, branches, feathers, simple lines called rods (bastoncillos), etc.). They are sometimes associated with hinds. For example, one of the foremost panels of gallery A has these kinds of idiomorphs associated with a vulva and a hind. In the second group of Gallery C there is a bison (panel 83) which may have a linear sign associated (it looks like a javelin, but that idea is very controversial), as well as some other symbol. At the side is a feather-shaped symbol grouped with other key-shaped (claviform) ones (discussed below) which were not identified in the original monograph (but became known through an article by Leroi-Gourhan).
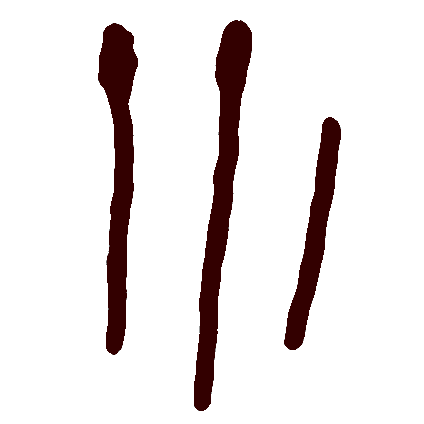
Rods

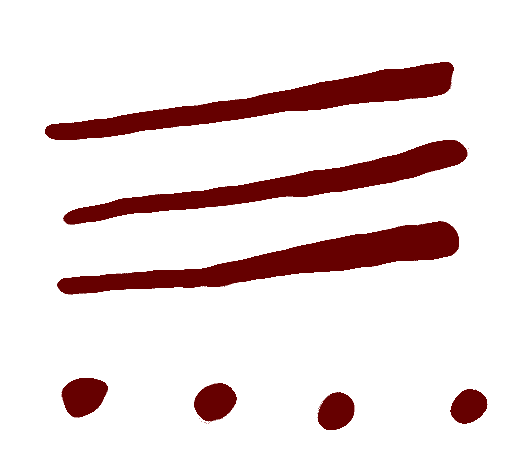
Bar and dot signs

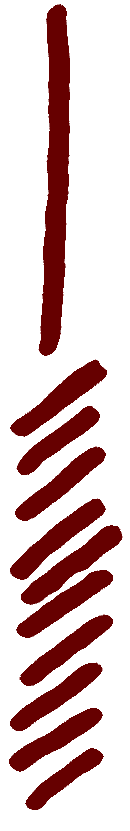
Arrow-shaped sign

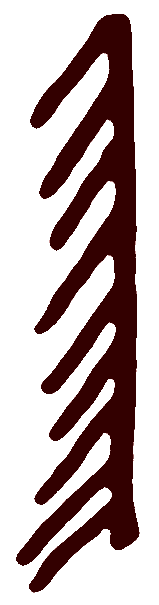
Feather-shaped sign

Finally there is a series of signs involving rods which appear in the entries to Galleries B and C. Breuil interpreted this type of sign in relation to the topographical changes within the sanctuary, which is possible: they could be marks which the initiates followed, or which warned them of possible dangers such as clefts. Certainly the difficult areas of the cave when visited can be negotiated more easily thereby. For Leroi-Gourhan, they are male symbols in binary relation to the cave itself, which represents the female principle (discussed below).

- Claviform signs: The signs called 'claviform' (key-shaped) are fairly abundant, specially in gallery B and in Room XI, but are doubtful if not indeed non-existent in Gallery A. Those of Room XI are the most characteristic and may be associated with horses. One of these can be considered as what Leroi-Gourhan calls a 'coupled sign', made by uniting in the same idiomorph a line or bar (masculine) with a key-shape (feminine). The typology and chronology of these signs is very ample.
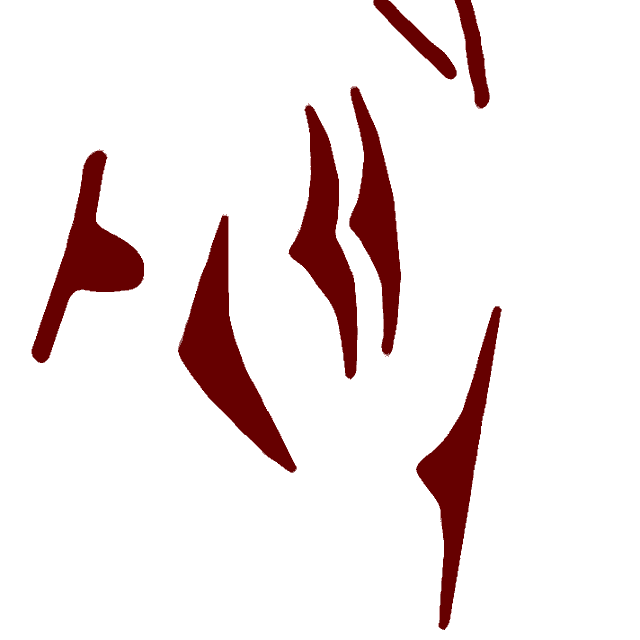
Claviform symbols

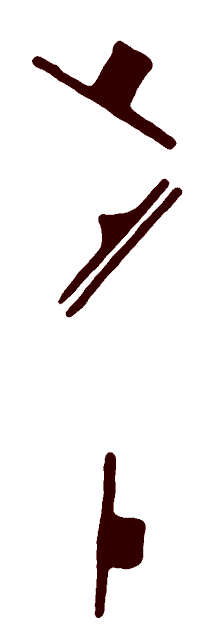
Coupled claviforms

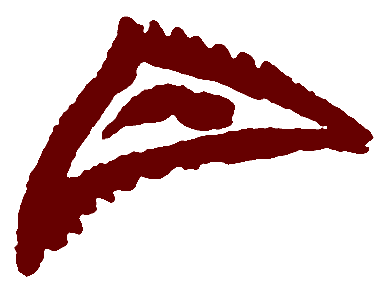
Triangular sign

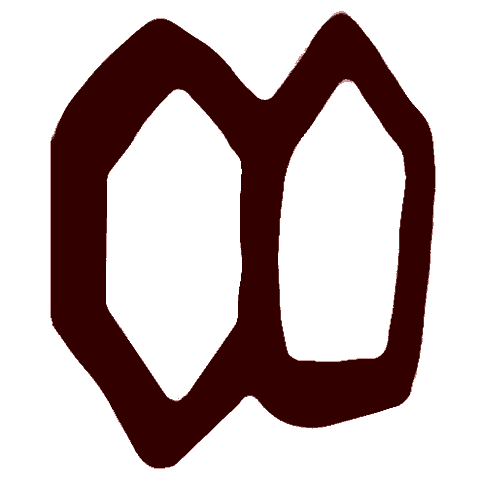
Polygonal signs
- Polygonal signs are a varied group, a general category which includes rectangular, pentagonal and hexagonal signs. There is one in every room and, although they are few, one can draw comparisons with examples in other caves. for example there is a grill-shaped sign in Gallery B which can be compared with others in the cave of Aguas de Novales and of Marsoulas. In Gallery A there is a rectangular sign comparable to one which is found in one of the recesses at Lascaux. Lastly there is a sign formed by a pentagon and a hexagon side by side which, in the opinion of the specialist Pilar Casado, should be classified as a variant of the oval signs.
- Tectiform signs: These are without any question the most abundant signs of this cave. They have a more or less rectangular shape, with and without additions, with and without internal divisions. Despite their frequency, these signs are absent from Gallery B. Breuil established a chronology and development through all of them; according to Leroi-Gourhan they belong to Style III and they have parallels in many caves of Spain and France, the nearest being the cave of El Castillo. At La Pasiega they are found in the end area and the narrow defile of Gallery A, and in the first large group of Room XI.

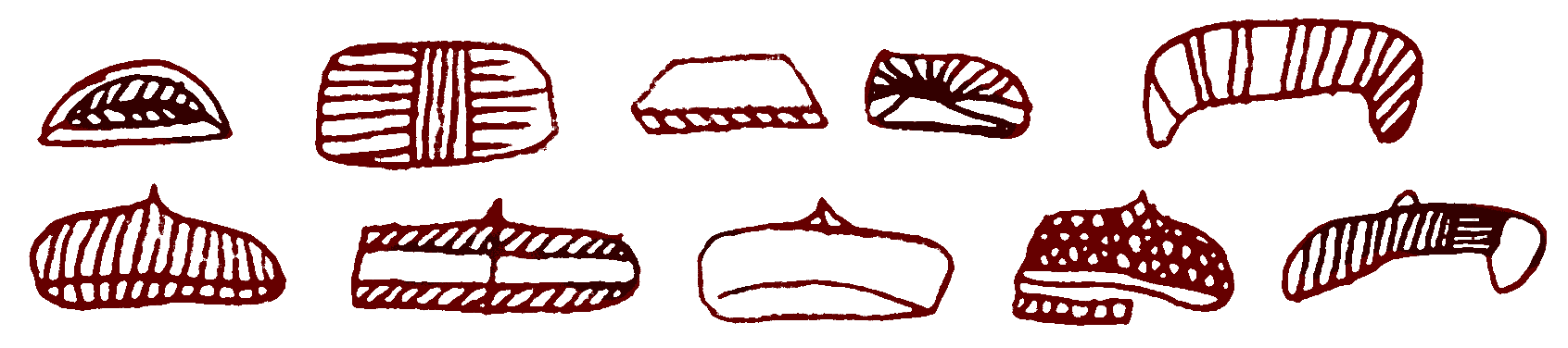
Tectiform signs in Gallery A

- Unique signs:

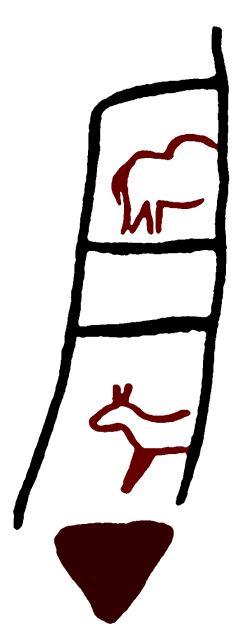
"La Trampa"

- La Trampa: Mentioning this strange pictorial group in his description of Gallery C, Breuil was the first to appreciate that really it is the result of painting a symbol like a rectangular black tectiform sign, of very evolved type, superimposed upon two older red figures. Leroi-Gourhan accepted that it was the result of combining paintings of different dates, but did not think it should be thought of as a developed tectiform sign: but he thought that the repainting was intentional and concerned the effect of enclosing the animals (the hind-quarters of a bison and the fore-parts, the head and forelegs of a deer) within the idiomorph; he included it all within Style III and interpreted it as a mithogram resulting from the combination of three symbols of femininity. Jordá Cerdá and Casado López do not admit of a female symbology in 'La Trampa', which they relate, rather, to other representations of sealed enclosures which occur in Las Chimeneas and La Pileta.
- The 'Inscription' of Gallery B is even more complex and unique than these signs; such that Breuil interpreted it as an authentic inscription which contained a coded message for initiates. Leroi-Gourhan goes to some lengths to explain that, being deconstructed, the figure is composed of feminine symbols. Jordá sees in it a typical sign in the form of a 'sack' related to the sealed enclosures mentioned before, and to serpentine forms which appear at the end of its Middle Cycle. Casado López finds parallels at Marsoulas and Font de Gaume. Amelkin proposes a way to read the inscription using the symbols of the Australian Aborigines as well as the Proto-Afroasiatic pictograms. Genevieve von Petzinger, who has studied idiomorphs from a wide variety of European caves, holds that these symbols are not writing as strictly defined, but is confident "that Ice Age rock art was meaningful to those who created it and did have communicative properties" and "that those particular markings represent an early attempt to string multiple signs together in order to create a more complex message".

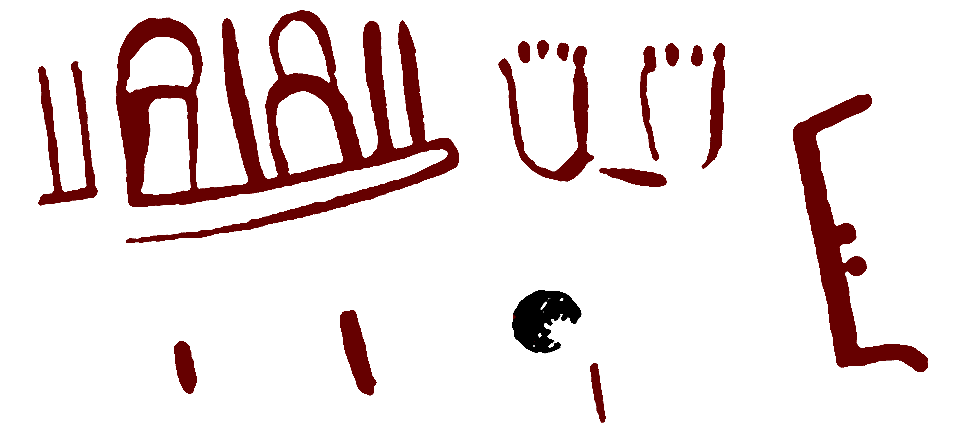
The so-called 'Inscription of La Pasiega'

- Human representations: This includes human images, more or less realistic, whether of a part or of the whole human anatomy. The foremost of the partial representations is the vulva: there can be identified three of oval, another rectangular and one triangular, very near 'La Trampa'. Also in this group are the hands which are painted in different ways in la Pasiega: one of these is schematic, which is called a maniform, related, as said above, to those of Santian. There is also a red hand in positive (with six fingers and in relation to a rectangular grill sign). Finally there is another positive hand, but in black, with continuing lines which may be meant to represent an arm. After this come the presumed complete human representations or anthropomorphs.
- The anthropomorphs can be counted as three (four if we count the lines which seem to complete the black hand already mentioned), and all of them are very debatable. The most doubtful of all is in Gallery A, which could be a female representation associated with fragmentary animals which are difficult to identify. Also debatable is another, that is executed in red tinta plana, with a globular form, located in Room XI. Very near is the one anthropomorph accepted as such by all investigators, namely a figure in varied colors: the body is outlined in red, with a large mouth; by contrast the skin is black, and there are added some horns, also black (in the opinion of the specialists these are re-paintings of different dates): lower down the figure has a linear idiomorph in yellow ochre which Breuil interpreted as a phallus. In relation to this human shape there are two external red symbols.
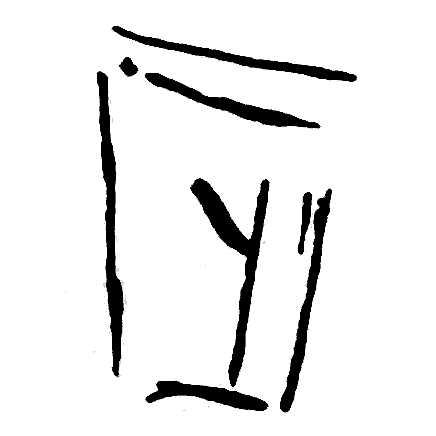
Vulva

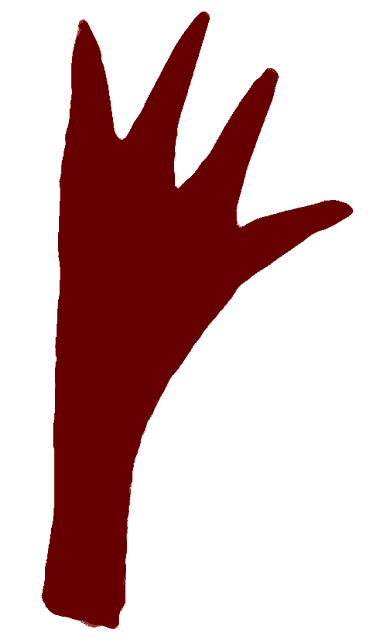
Hand-shaped symbol

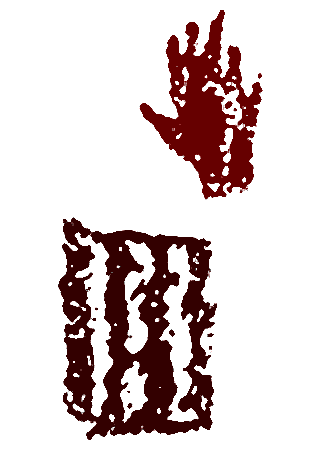
Hand impression and idiomorph

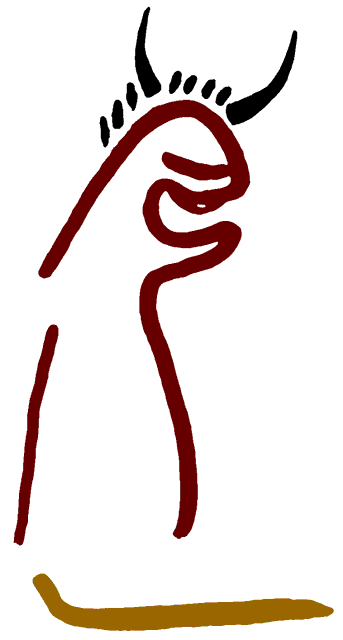
Anthropomorph

== Attempts of chronology ==
The cave of La Pasiega offers many examples of overpaintings and repaintings, which allow attempts of a relative chronology: on the other hand, the great variety of techniques and colors employed make one think of a fairly extensive chronological sequence. The authors of the 1913 monograph ended by establishing three chronological phases which span practically the whole development of palaeolithic art: two Aurignacian phases, a Solutrean and a peak of two-color work (very rare in such paintings), which could be Magdalenian Later Henri Breuil, one of the authors of the monograph, increased the decorative phases to eleven, within the same chronological framework.

In 1968 came the analysis of Leroi-gourhan, who proposed a rather general chronology, which broadly was in agreement with González Echegaray. In both publications the decorations of the entire Gallery A and the first sub-sanctuary of Room XI are placed at the very start of Style III; whereas the second sub-sanctuary of the same room should be placed within the earliest Style IV. Leroi-Gourhan argued from the basis of comparing the works of Gallery A with Lascaux, although recognising that that is more archaic, suggested that they were contemporaneous. Recently, as a result of being able to apply absolute systems of dating to the paintings, it has been demonstrated that the style-classification proposed by Leroi-Gourhan, and some relative dating of other investigators, is shaky. (Note: Chauvet and Niaux also were included within Style III, but the absolute chronology relocates them in the Gravettian (25000 years B.P.), see Clottes, J. (1995): 'Les peintures de la Grotte Chauvet Pont d´Arc, á Vallon Pont d´Arc (Ardèche, France): datations directes et indirectes par la methode du radiocarbone', in Comptes-Rendus de la Académie des Sciences de Paris, vol. 320, Nº serie IIª. Paris, pp. 1113-1140: also Lorbanchet, M. (1995), Les Grottes ornées de la Prehistoire; nouveaux regards, Ed. Errance, Paris. The opposite seems to happen in the cave of Las Chimeneas, near La Pasiega, which was grouped with it for stylistic reasons('The animals which accompany them are perfectly of Style III', Leroi Gourhan, French version of 1965, p. 269), but, since then, radiocarbon datings have made them much younger, in the Magdalenian.)

Jordá took on the task of revising the chronology of La Pasiega. His last publications place the decoration of this cave in his "Middle Cycle: Solutrean-Magdalenian", accepting integrally the eleven phases of Breuil, but without allowing (or at least seriously doubting) that any part of the decoration could really be Aurignacian. In the Solutrean phase of the Middle Cycle he includes the figures painted in red, and those with fine lines or outlines; also some of the figures in the tampanado method. The engravings of this period would be, according to Jordá, rare and crude. A little later come the incomplete red horses, but in a lively and realistic style, some of the idiomorphs and the so-called inscription. During the second part of his Middle Cycle, he says, of the Cantabrian Lower Magdalenian, the archaizing engraved contours continue, but there also appears the multiple and striated line drawing in the horses of Galleries B and C, and in the hinds of Gallery C. The painted figures can be red, with tamponado, outline or modelled line. But more important are the tinta plana red paintings treated with modelled chiaroscuro, sometimes associated with graved or black lines which complete them: These are the ones which express dynamism most of all (twisting of the neck, movement of the legs, etc.). For some authors, these figures are the most evolved. The bi-chromes are rare, and in the majority of cases we are dealing with later corrections in a different color to the original painting. Only a horse from gallery A, in the final group, could be considered an authentic bichrome, comparable to those of El Castillo. The most abundant idiomorphs are the quadrangular ones with internal divisions. Jordá maintains that, during the Middle Cycle, the anthropomorphs disappear, even though La Pasiega contains a few: according to the oldest authors four, and according to the most recent only one.

Periodicity of Palaeolithic Art

González Echegaray and González Sáinz seem to have shared the general idea proposed by Leroi-Gourhan, which accepts that the works of La Pasiega belong to Styles III and IV. In fact, pretty much all of Gallery A and the first assemblage of Gallery C (room XI) belongs to Style III, in which predominates the red painting with simple lines or lined tamponados, also including the block colors and the addition of engraving or the bi-chrome work as a complement to model the volumes. For its part Style IV is present above all in Gallery B and in the second group of Gallery C: this phase has mainly the black color or drawn with a fine linear outlining, almost without modeling, but with an internal filling of scratches. The engraved forms are most abundant (simple linear marks, or repeated or striated lines, including scraffito).

== See also ==
- Art of the Upper Paleolithic
- List of Stone Age art
