= Jaime Enrique Aymara =

Jaime Enrique Aymara Reinoso
- Born: Jaime Enrique Aymara Reinoso; June 24, 1968 (age 58); San Roque, Quito, Ecuador
- Genres: Tecnocumbia; Tecnopaseíto; Bolero
- Occupation: Singer

Jaime Enrique Aymara Reinoso (Quito, June 24, 1968) is an Ecuadorian singer and actor of tecnocumbia, tecnopaseíto bachata, national music, pasillo, pump Bolero, guayno jukebox pop music merengue, pop-flamenco, cumbia pop ballads, salsa, vallenato reggaeton and waltz. The lyrics of their songs are based on true stories of people in their country is known as "The idol of Ecuador" and "The idol of Quinceañeras", besides being much in demand in Latin concerts performed abroad as it is known for Ecuadorian emigrants.

== Early life and education ==
Aymara was born in Quito, Ecuador, in the San Roque on June 24, 1968 in the district of San Roque. He was a member of the choir at the Republic of Chile school and the San Pedro Pascual school. In 1989 he terminated his studies at the Central University of Ecuador, after having completed 2 years at the School of Dentistry to dedicate himself completely to music. At 17 years old, he left Quito for Guayaquil, to participate in a singing contest on the Chispazos program, put on by the TC television station. He earned third place. He founded "Dinastía Aymara" (Aymara Dynasty) with his brothers Azucena, Gustavo, Tamara, Marlon and Gus. He also has a son and a daughter.

== Career ==
Aymara began his professional career in 1989 at the age of 17 and recorded the song Mi Linda Muchachita, which was well received throughout the country. Radio announcer, Armando Heredia, announced him as "el ídolo de las quiciañeras" (the Quinceañera idol), and he has been known as such ever since. Throughout his career he has used various musical genres including pasillo, bolero, vals, bomba and música popular. In 2000 he gained national and international popularity with his technocumbia album titled Dime como se olvida. The following year he produced Lágrimas de hombre. In 2002 he released the single Así es el Amor from the album Ya no quiero llorar which earned him Latin radio media recognition for Album of the Year in Europe. That same year he was named one of the sexiest Ecuadorian men by Vistazo. In 2003 he won the Premiso Lo Nuestro award for best tropical male singer, awarded by La Onda magazine and TC Television, for his DVD Que la Detengan. This contained familiar material with a mix of all his hits and new songs which included Pop-Flamenco.<ref."Entrevista Jaime Enrique Aymara". Ocio Latino. November 8, 2010.</ref>

In 2004, he produced an album with tropical rhythms titled Tarjetita de Invitación. In 2005 he won greater acceptance among Ecuadorans residing in Europe, leading to several shows in (Germany), Switzerland, England, Spain, Italy, France and Belgium. He was also the first Ecuadoran artist to reach Sweden. He also toured the United States, Canada, Peru and Colombia successfully. He returned with a new album composed of reggaeton songs entitled Mis Mejores 20 Éxitos, which he recorded in Europe. From July 5 of that year he was busy with a new album named Corazón de Piedra, in which he sang his classics plus new techno-cumbia, bolero, reggaeton sounds, among others.

In 2007, he participated in the reality show Bailando por un sueño on Gamavisión where he won third place. As a result of the fame he got at the national level by the reality show, he decided to introduce to the Ecuadoran market a perfume with a male and female fragrance, which he called "Jaime Enrique Aymara" and "Gaby" respectively . Later that same year he released an album with salsa and bolero rhythms entitled Mi Historia Musical.

He also ventured into acting and drama series with appearances in Pasado y Confeso, De La Vida Real, Las Zuquillo, Acolítame, Mostro de Amor, Puro Teatro and he was in the movie Zuquillo Exprés.

He had a lead role as José boyfriend of Juliana, played by tecnocumbia singer Hipatia Balseca, in a film by Carlos Piñeiros entitled Desde Abajo, which premiered in April 2009. On October 30, he performed a re-edited version of El Arbolito with rock and cumbia fusiones alongside the Quito rock group, Estación Zero. This was done in honor of the Argentine Peruvian group Néctar, who died in a car accident in 2007 . The idea of the fusion of genres was proposed by Hugo Albuja, vocalist for Estación Zero. It was recorded by Juan Manuel Jacome, a member of the TercerMundo band.

In September 2011, Aymara launched new material entitled Te eché al olvido and was hired as host of a new morning show called Cinco minutos más on TV Canela, alongside Katty Egas, former member of tecnocumbia group, Tierra Canela.

In 2012, he has released new material entitled Mala Mujer with humorous topics such El Cholero 2. Because of his background and experience he was hired as a judge on the reality show Ecuador Tiene Talento (Ecuador has talent) along with Karla Kanora and Diego Spotorno.

== Discography ==
=== Phonograms ===
| Year | Title | | | |
|---|---|---|---|---|
| 1989 | Mi Linda Muchachita | | | |
| 1997 | Vol. 3 | | | |
| 1997 | Melina; Cómo te voy an Olvidar; Confundido; Mi Reina | Vendaval; Triste y Sólo; Eres to do para Mí; Carta Maldita | De Cantina en Cantina; El Picaflor; Adiós mundo Cruel; Ya nada te Queda | Te juro que te Amo; Llora Corazón; María María |
| 1999 | Vol. 5 | | | |
| 1999 | Corazón Traidor/Dos Cervezas; Pena Penita; Separados Por Qué?; Amor con Amor se Paga; Te pido que Vuelvas/Vagabundo Soy | La Distancia/Cenizas; Baila Baila Negra; Tabacundeña/Ñatita; Las Estrellas/Anita; Ecuador y Colombia/Por qué te vas | Buscando un Amor; Bella Flor; Zeneida/El Bandido; No quiero Llanto; Tan sólo | Mosaico Tex-Mex: Borrachito/La Vecina/No puedo Olvidarte |
| 2000 | Dime como se olvida | | | |
| 2000 | Dime cómo se Olvida; Siempre Pierdo en el Amor | Corazón Sufrido | Basta Ya mi Amor | Salvemos Nuestro Amor |
| 2001 | Lágrimas de hombre | | | |
| 2001 | Lágrimas de Hombre; Olvidarte Jamás; Aprendiendo a Vivir | Tu partida; No comprendí tu Amor; Te Extraño | Juraré no Amarte más; Maldito Corazón; Brindo por Ella | Cenizas de Amor |
| 2002 | Ya no quiero llorar | | | |
| 2002 | Ya no quiero Llorar; Penumbras; Hoy he ganado en el Amor | Así es el Amor; Amor Ausente; Carta Final | Amor Incomparable; Tengo que Olvidarte; No voy a llorar por Tí | Qué puedo hacer; El Día de mi Muerte; Ay Corazón |
| 2003 | Que la Detengan | | | |
| 2004 | Tarjetita de invitación | | | |
| 2004 | Tarjetita de Invitación | Ay Pobre Amor | No te Vayas | Pagando La Cuenta |
| 2005 | Mis mejores 20 éxitos | | | |
| 2005 | Así es el Amor; Tarjetita de Invitación; Sólo estoy tomando; Qué puedo hacer; Lágrimas de Hombre | Ay pobre Amor; Maldito Corazón; Dime cómo se olvida; Pagando la Cuenta; Siempre pierdo en el Amor | Angustia; Basta ya mi Amor; Ya no quiero llorar; Mil Amores; No te vayas | Corazón Sufrido; Atrévete; No vuelvas a Mí; Cuánto Daría; El último Adiós |
| 2005 | DVD El Rey de la tecnocumbia | | | |
| 2005 | Presentación; Tarjetita de Invitación; Basta ya mi Amor; Lágrimas de Amor | Mil Amores; Ay pobre Amor; Mi corazón Sufrido; Así es el Amor | Que la Detengan; Siempre pierdo en el Amor; Mix: Triste y Sólo/Angustia/No te vayas | Sólo estoy Tomando; Ya no Quiero Llora |
| 2007 | Mi Historia Musical | | | |
| 2007 | Soy soltero | En vida | Que importa mi amor | La botella |
| 2011 | Te eché al olvido | | | |
| 2011 | Te eché al olvido | Motor y motivo | Corazón sufrido | Pensando en ti |
| 2012 | Mala mujer | | | |
| ???? | De Todo Para Todos | | | |
| ???? | Yo Soy Jaime Enrique Aymara | | | |
| ???? | Corazón equivocado | | | |
| ???? | Las cumbias más lindas del mundo | | | |
| ???? | Caminito Serrano; Tu Amor fue una Mentira; Amor y Llanto | Los Celos (La Tuza); El Muñeco de la Ciudad; Sin Alma y Sin Corazón | Sal y Agua; Ella Es, Tu Fuiste; Lágrimas de Amor | Corazón Valiente; Te lo Juro Yo; Nadie como Tu |

=== Videograms ===
| Year | Title | | | |
|---|---|---|---|---|
| 2005 | Corazón de Piedra | | | |
| 2005 | Corazón de Piedra; Perdóname; El Triste; Vagabundo, Borracho, Loco; Por tu Amor; Mátame | El Cholero; Falsa Mujer; Vienes y te Vas; Trato de Olvidarte; A nadie mas Amarás; Tomaré para Olvidarte | El Guardaespaldas; Más que tu Amigo; Hasta Cuando; Gallito Feliz; Nadie es Eterno; El Cigarrillo | La Indifferencia; Nuestro Juramento; Mix: La Canción de los Andes/Collar de Lágrimas/El Provinciano |
| 2005 | DVD Jaime Enrique Aymara | | | |
| 2005 | Corazón de Piedra; Tarjetita de Invitación; El Cigarrillo | Hasta cuando; El Choclero; Ay pobre Amor | Siempre pierdo en el Amor; Vagabundo, Borracho, Loco; Lágrimas de Amor | Así es el Amor; Que la detengan; Mix: Triste y Solo/Ya no quiero llorar/Aunque nos digan Amantes |
| 2011 | Motor y Motivo | | | |
| 2011 | Motor y Motivo; Adiós Amor; Y Volar; Con un Vaso de Cerveza | Embrujo; Pensando en Ti; Corazón Equivocado; Te Extraño | Mix Te Quiero Manabí; Mi Desventura; Caraway; Paloma Ajena | Mix éxitos |

== Filmography ==
| Year | Film | Role |
|---|---|---|
| 2009 | Desde Abajo | José |
| 2010 | Zuquillo Exprés | Godson of Meche |
