= Úrsula Strenge =

Ecuadorian television presenter (born 1973)

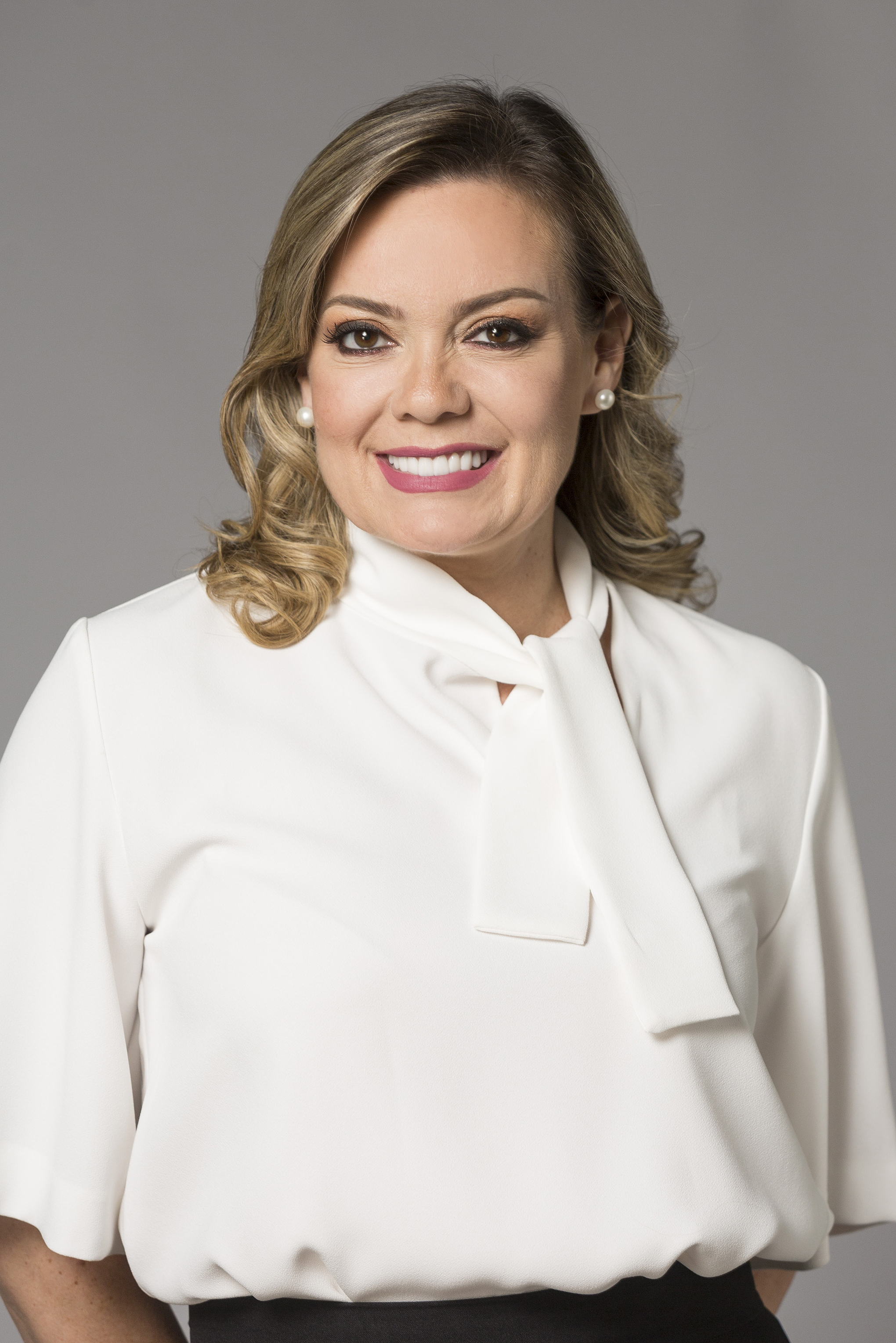
- Strenge in 2019
- Born: Úrsula Hanna Strenge Chávez; 1 September 1973 (age 51); Guayaquil, Ecuador
- Occupations: Television presenter; actress; clinical psychologist
- Years active: Since 1994
- Spouse: Iván Nogales Colmont (m. 2000; died 2014)
- Partner: Isaac Delgado Balladares (2021-now)
- Children: 3

Úrsula Hanna Strenge Chávez (born 1 September 1973) is an Ecuadorian television presenter, actress, clinical psychologist and Master in Systemic Family Therapy with experience in private practice, educational institutions and mental health. She is currently a municipal councilor of Guayaquil for the Social Christian Party, representing electoral district 3.

== Career ==
Strenge began as a host in a musical youth program called "Buen Dato", on CRE Televisión. In 1994, she debuted as an actress playing the role of “Hannah” on the Dr. Expertus show, together with Galo Recalde. In 1995, the show won the award for the best children's program in Latin America, where one of the members of the jury was Roberto Gómez Bolaños. In 1996, she was the presenter of the first interactive program on Ecuadorian television, called "Pulsa y Gana" on Teleamazonas, followed by the program in magazine format "Buenos Días", also the contest program "Buen Lot", and the children's show "Xibalux".

In 2002, Ecuavisa created the program Está Clarito, which Strenge hosted together with Richard Barker, Bernarda Calvo, María Teresa Guerrero and Vanessa Passailaigue. In 2006, she was part of the morning program En Contacto with Richard Barker, María Teresa Guerrero, Diego Spotorno, Efraín Ruales, Gabriela Pazmiño, Henry Bustamante, Michela Pincay among others, until her departure from Ecuavisa in 2018. In Ecuavisa, she also hosted the orientation program Familia en construcción in 2007, and the reality show Factor X Kids in 2015.

Strenge also made special appearances in the telenovela El Cholito, and in the series ¡Así pasa! In 2013, she starred in the series Veto al feo, along with Efraín Ruales, a TV series based on the Colombian telenovela Yo soy Betty, la fea.

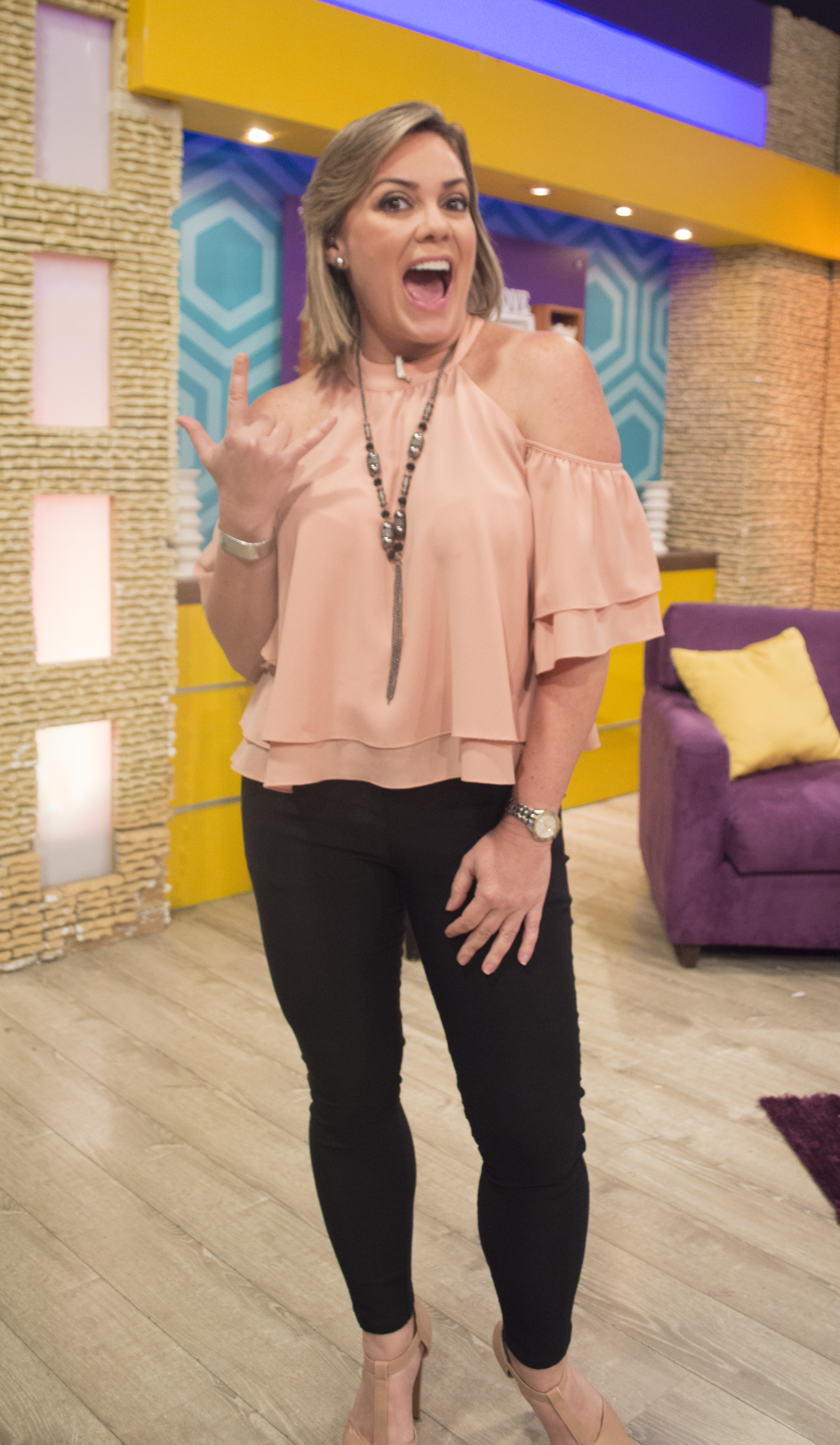
Strenge in 2017.

In 2017, Strenge starred in the series Porque soy tu madre, produced by Claro Video, together with Claudia Camposano and Carolina Jaume. After 2 years away from television, in 2020 she joined RTS as presenter of the program "Noticias de la Mañana" together with Isaac Delgado and José Luis Arévalo; she left the show in July 2021.

== Personal life ==
Strenge was married to Guayaquil businessman Iván Nogales Colmont, whom she married in 2000 and had 3 daughters: Camila, Ivanna and Cristina Nogales Strenge. Nogales died on 13 December 2014 at the age of 45, due to a heart attack. Since May 2021, Strenge has been in a romantic relationship with television presenter Isaac Delgado, her partner on the program "Noticias de la Mañana".
