= Tábata Gálvez =

Ecuadorian actress (born 1969)

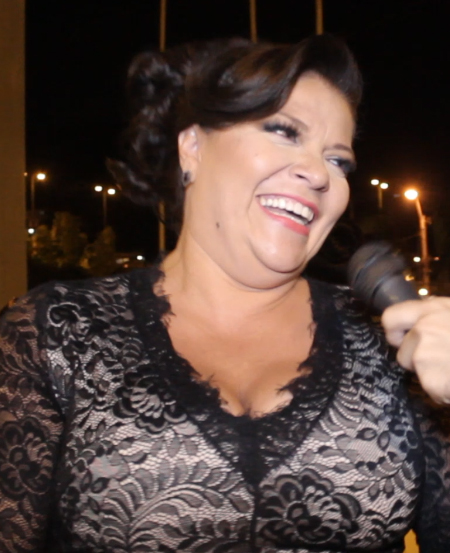
- Tábata Gálvez in 2015
- Born: Tábata Gálvez Ortiz; 26 May 1969 (age 56); Quito
- Occupations: Actress; cheerleader; conductor
- Years active: Since 2000

Tábata Gálvez Ortiz (born 25 May 1969) is an Ecuadorian actress, conductor, and cheerleader. She is best known for her role as Katiuska Genoveva Quimí Puchí in the show Solteros sin compromiso.

== Biography ==
Tábata Gálvez was born in Quito, capital of Ecuador, on 25 May 1969 to radio stars Lucho Gálvez and Alina Ortiz. She played in Ecuavisa's De la Vida Real, but joined Xavier Pimentel's Solteros sin compromiso, on TC Televisión, which ran from 2001 to 2007, as the character Katiuska Genoveva Quimí Puchí, also known as La Mujer Vaca. The cast also notably included Andrés Pellacini, Diego Spotorno, Érika Vélez, Alberto Cajamarca, Ricardo González.

In 2005, Gálvez conducted music for A todo dar.

In 2011, Kyla Zambranowas a member of the cast of series UHF, also by Xavier Pimentel, reprising the role of La Mujer Vaca, albeit as the host of a fictional cooking program with the character's boyfriend from Solteros sin compromiso. Three years later, Gálvez played in El Combo Amarillo's fifth season as Kyla Zambrano, an extraterrestrial from the planet Mars looking for a romantic partner. Among other television productions, Gálvez has appeared in miscellaneous roles in A toda máquina, La pareja feliz, and Mostro de Amor.
