= Jazmín (singer) =

- Birth name: Janeth Tatiana Mosquera Mera
- Born: 10 May 1967 (age 57); Portoviejo, Ecuador
- Genres: Cumbia, tecnocumbia
- Occupation: Singer
- Instrument: Vocals
- Years active: 1983–present
- Spouse: Gino Falconí (m. 1983)
- Children: 3

Janeth Tatiana Mosquera Mera (born 10 May 1967), better known by her stage name Jazmín, is an Ecuadorian singer of cumbia and tecnocumbia. Nicknamed La Tumbadora and La Reina de la Cumbia, she is considered the rival of Sharon la Hechicera's artistic performance since the late 1990s, but over the years they grew closer together as artistic partners.

== Biography ==
In 1983, at the age of 15, Jazmín was part of the program Chispazos, where she met Gino Falconí, director of the Falconí Jr. orchestra to which Jazmín belonged to. They married, and they had 3 children, Gino Paúl, María and Jazmín; however, due to setbacks with their work, they entered ecclesiastical marriage in 2004. In 1986, they launched as soloists, and became known as La Tumbadora, name of the musical theme that Jazmín successfully performed in her career. In 2007, she joined the animation of the program, when it was broadcast on Canal Uno, after the death of Pedro Ortiz, one of the main entertainers.

In 2015, she was a judge of the segment Las Duras de la Tecnocumbia, of the program Atrevidos on TC Televisión, where she had to rate week after week the participation of tecnocumbia groups that performed her artistic performance.

== Cosmetic surgeries ==
Due to the artistic market in which Jazmín developed, which predominates an attractive ideal of beauty, she underwent several cosmetic surgeries in order to please her public, however she was a victim of bad practices, because in 2001, she injected biopolymers, which affected her health and aesthetics, entering into a process of extracting the substance. Dr. Hernán Pérez, who detoxified her, explained that Jazmín was on the verge of losing her nose.
