= Strenge =

Strenge is a surname. Notable people with the surname include:

- Christian Strenge (1757–1825), American artist
- Úrsula Strenge (born 1973), Ecuadorian television presenter and actress
- Walter Strenge (1898–1974), American cinematographer
