= La grotte =

La grotte or la grotte may refer to:

- Nicolas de La Grotte (1530 – c. 1600), French composer
- La Grotte, song by Debussy
- La Grotte des Fées, a cave in the Auvergne region of France
- Prix de la Grotte, a horse race run at Longchamp
