= Elvillar/Bilar =

- Municipality
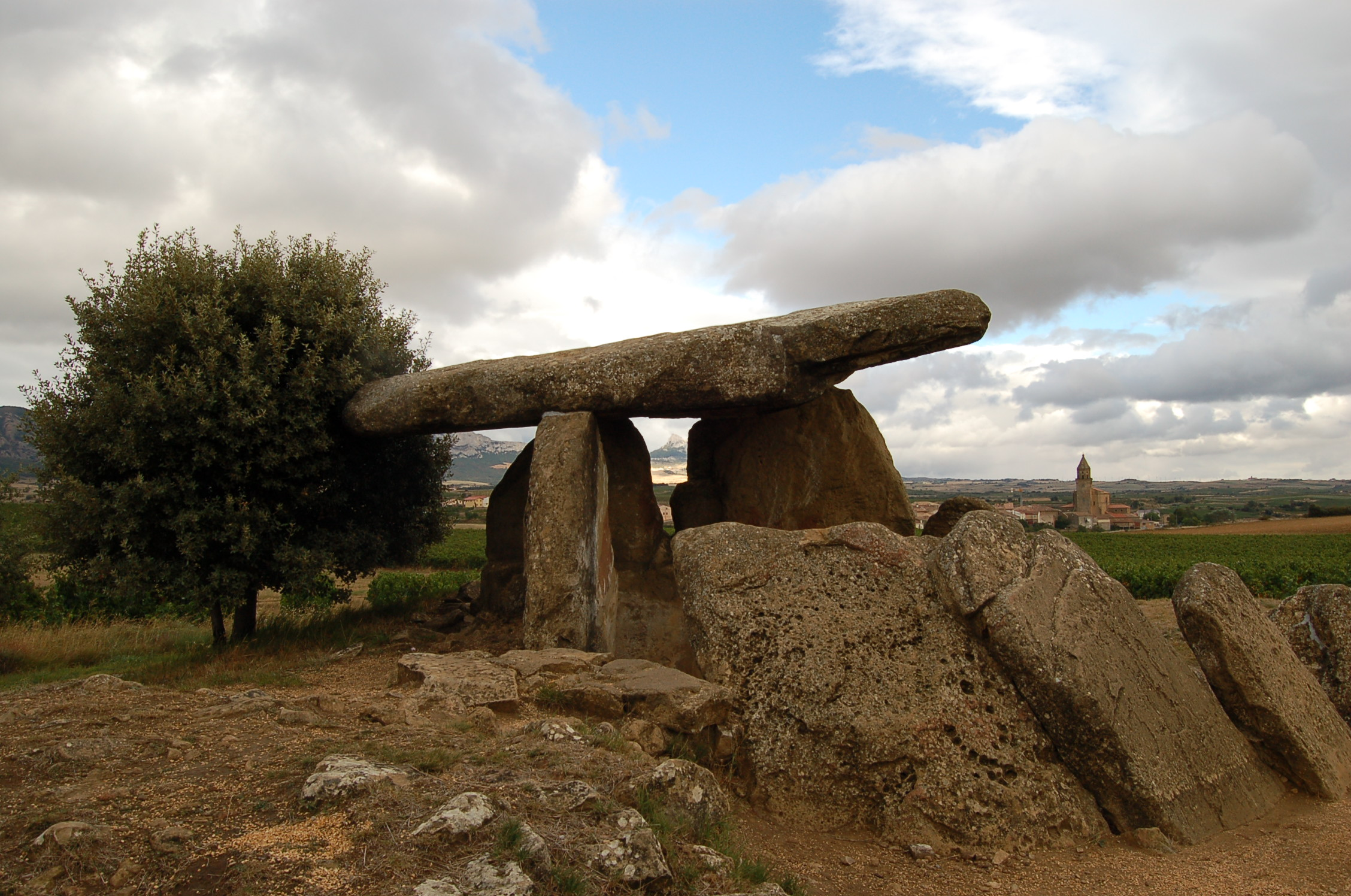
- La chabola de la Hechicera

- Flag Coat of arms

- Location of Elvillar/Bilar within the Basque Country Location of Elvillar/Bilar within Spain
- Coordinates: 42°34′N 2°32′W
- Country: Spain
- Autonomous Community: Basque Country
- Province: Álava
- Comarca: Rioja Alavesa

Government
  - Mayor: Gerardo Olano Medrano

Area
  - Total: 17.50 km^{2} (6.76 sq mi)
- Elevation (AMSL): 583 m (1,913 ft)

Population (2025-01-01)
  - Total: 315
  - Density: 18.0/km^{2} (46.6/sq mi)
- Time zone: UTC+1 (CET)
  - Summer (DST): UTC+2 (CEST (GMT +2))
- Postal code: 01309

Elvillar in Spanish or Bilar in Basque is a town and municipality located in the province of Álava, in the Basque Country, northern Spain.
