= Chabola de la Hechicera =

Archaeological site in the Basque Country, Spain

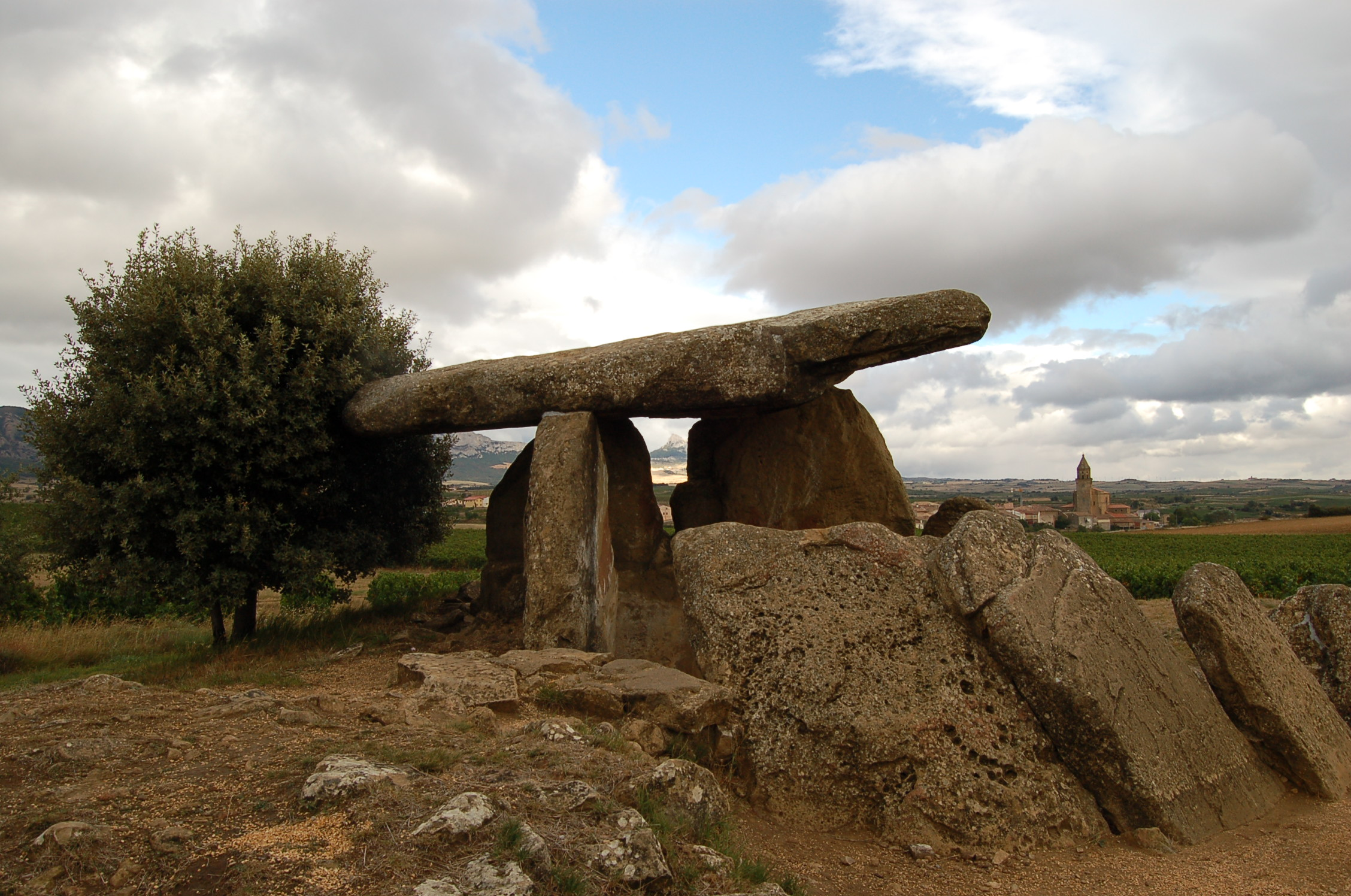
- The dolmen in 2006

- Location in Basque Country, Spain
- 42°34′03″N 2°33′13″W
- Type: Dolmen
- Location: Elvillar, Basque Country, Spain

History
- Built: c. 2000 BC

Site notes
- Archaeologists: Alvaro Gortazar; Jose Barandiaran
- Discovered: 1935 by Alvaro Gortazar

Basque Cultural Heritage
- Criteria: Monument complex
- Designated: 26 July 2011
- Part of: Dolmens of the Lowlands of the Historical Territory of Álava

The Chabola de la Hechicera (Spanish for 'The Witch's Hut', Basque: Sorginaren Txabola) is a dolmen in Elvillar, Álava in the Basque Country of Spain. Three large vertical stones support a large horizontal flat stone. Nine large stones form a chamber in a polygonal shape. The corridor is flanked by five stones and divided into two sections. The site was probably a funerary construction to hold the remains of the people in the settlement.

It was discovered in 1935 by Álvaro de Gortázar in a fair state of preservation. Jose Barandiaran explored it partially in 1936, finding two stone hammerstones, a polished axe of ophite, fragments of pottery and human remains. The stone lying on top was found broken into three parts, but it was restored and replaced in its assumed original position during the 1974 restoration. The finds are preserved in a museum in nearby Laguardia.

== See also ==
- Basque prehistory
