= Châtelperron =

- Commune
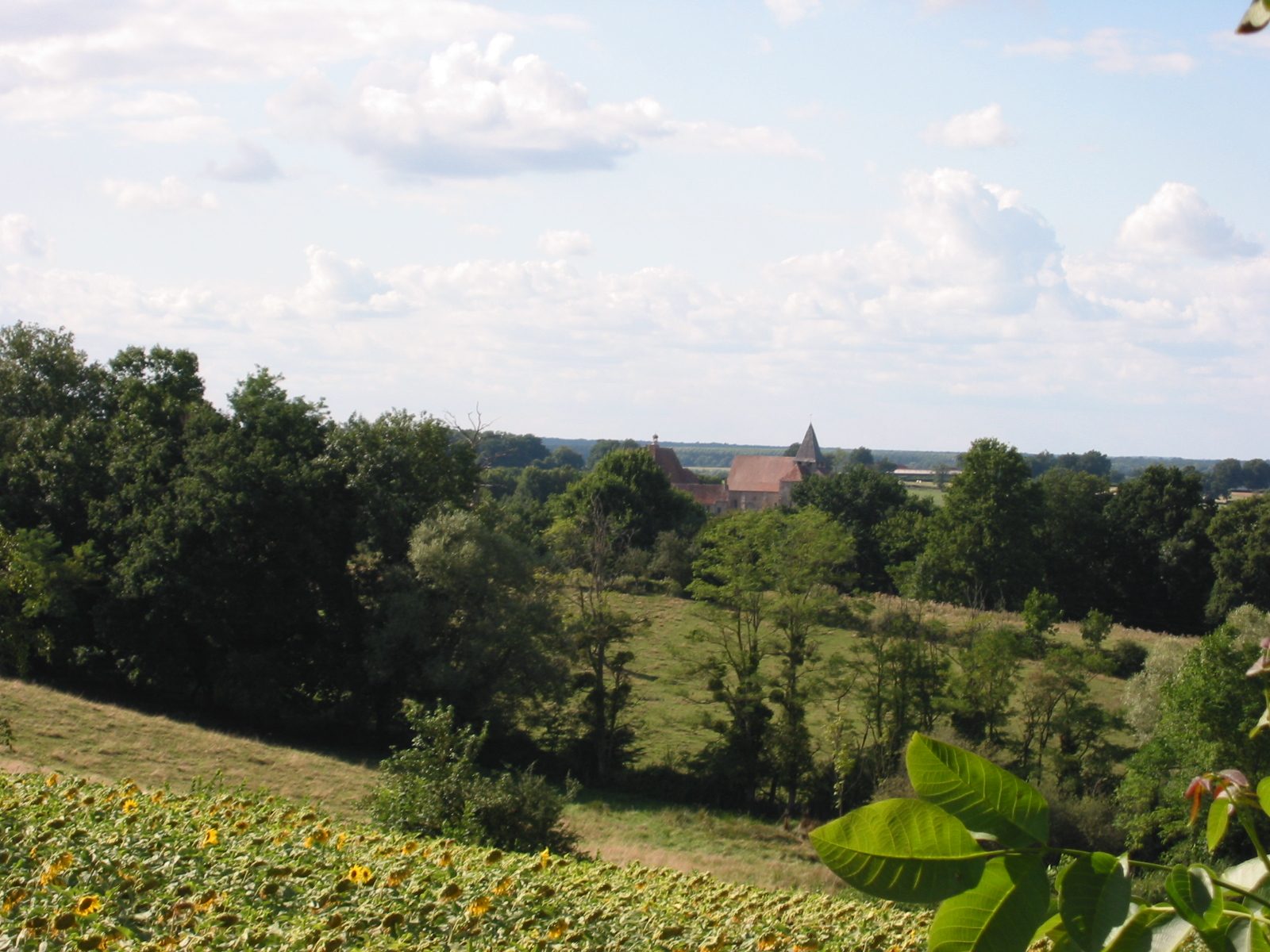
- A general view of Châtelperron

- Coat of arms
- Location of Châtelperron
- Location within France Location within Auvergne-Rhône-Alpes
- Coordinates: 46°23′59″N 3°38′14″E
- Country: France
- Region: Auvergne-Rhône-Alpes
- Department: Allier
- Arrondissement: Vichy
- Canton: Moulins-2

Government
  - Mayor (2026–32): Maria Schneider
- Area^{1}: 20.8 km^{2} (8.0 sq mi)
- Elevation: 253 m (830 ft)
- Highest elevation: 352 m (1,155 ft)
- Lowest elevation: 234 m (768 ft)
- Population (2023): 130
  - Density: 6.2/km^{2} (16/sq mi)
- Time zone: UTC+01:00 (CET)
  - Summer (DST): UTC+02:00 (CEST)
- INSEE/Postal code: 03067 /03220
- ^{1} French Land Register data, which excludes lakes, ponds, glaciers > 1 km^{2} (0.386 sq mi or 247 acres) and river estuaries.

Châtelperron (French pronunciation: [ʃatɛlpɛʁɔ̃]) is a commune in the central French department of Allier.

It is the location of the site known as La Grotte des Fées.

== Population ==
Historical population
Year	Pop.	±% p.a.
1968	287	—
1975	250	−1.95%
1982	219	−1.87%
1990	189	−1.82%
1999	137	−3.51%
2007	141	+0.36%
2012	155	+1.91%
2017	146	−1.19%
2023	130	−1.92%
Source: INSEE

== See also ==
- Châtelperronian
- Communes of the Allier department
