= Sharon la Hechicera =

Ecuadorian singer (1977–2015)

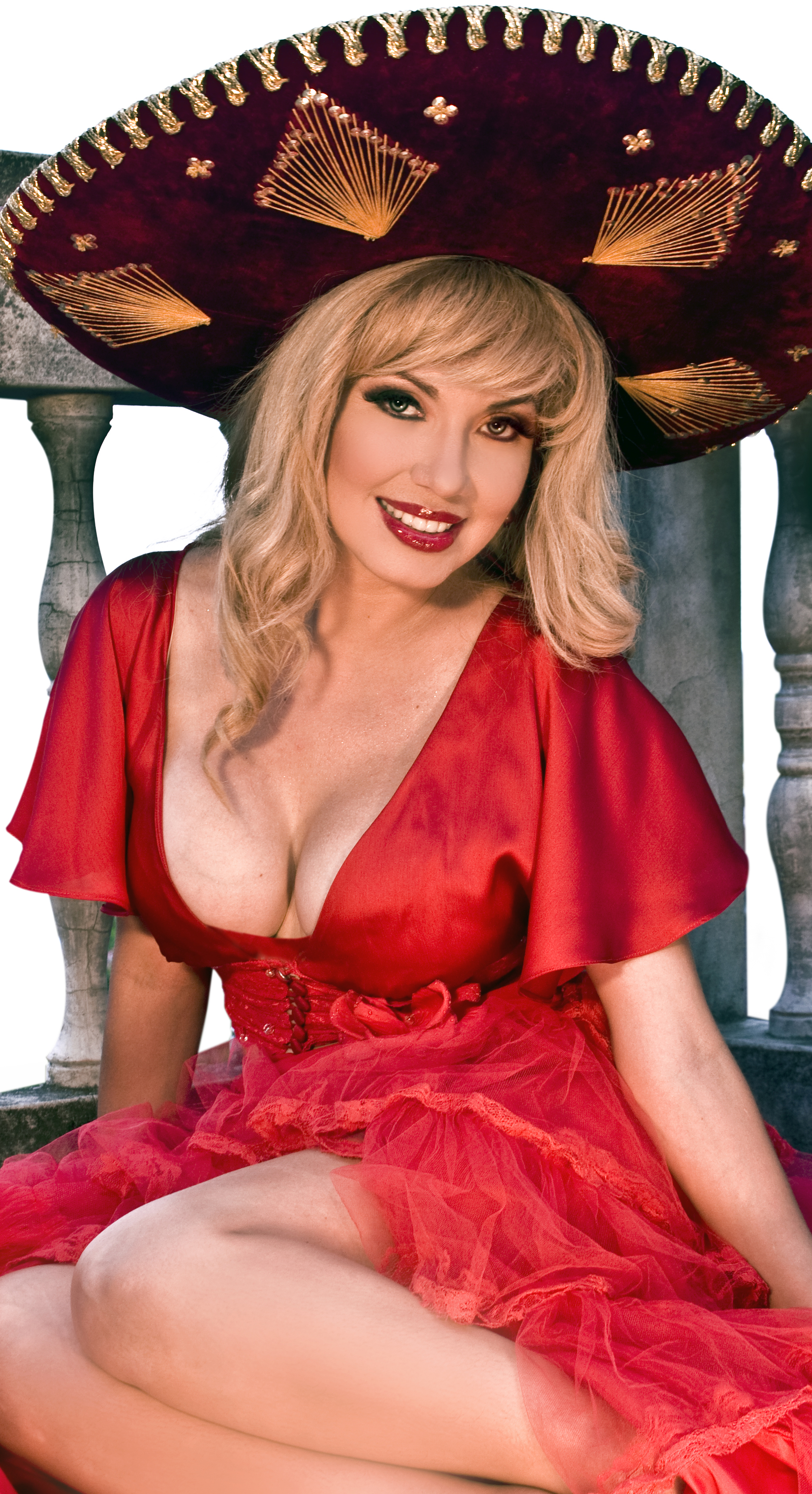
- Sharon la Hechicera in 2010
- Born: Edith Rosario Bermeo Cisneros; 28 March 1974; Guayaquil, Guayas Province, Ecuador
- Died: 4 January 2015 (aged 40); San Pablo, Santa Elena Province, Ecuador
- Other names: La Reina de la Tecnocumbia; La Diva; La Diva Criolla
- Years active: 1998–2015
- Spouse: Geovanny López (2011–2015)
- Children: 2, including Samantha Grey
- Website: sharonlahechicera.com

Sharon "La Hechicera" (transl. Sharon the Sorceress, born Edith Rosario Bermeo Cisneros; 28 March 1974 – 4 January 2015), also known by the nicknames La Reina de la Tecnocumbia, La Diva, and La Diva Criolla (Note: After Bermeo's death, some press and television media affirmed that she was born in 1977, but her birth certificate states that she was born in 1974.) was an Ecuadorian television actress, presenter, music producer, advertising and public relations consultant, lingerie designer, and singer known for her promotion and performing of the tecnocumbia genre. She was one of the most popular celebrities in Ecuador during her lifetime.

Bermeo was able to become an icon of Ecuadorian culture internationally. Over the course of her career, she released five studio albums.

== Early life and education ==
Sharon "La Hechicera" was born Edith Rosario Bermeo Cisneros in Guayaquil, Ecuador on 28 March 1974, but she spent her childhood in the city of Durán. Her nickname at home was "Charo" or "Charito," but it morphed into "Sharon" as the pronunciation of the letter n at the end of either was added and gradually became more prominent. Bermeo took to calling herself Sharon Bermeo, but chose to take the stage name "Sharon la Hechicera," or "Sharon the Sorceress," in reference to her favorite streamerLOGRONOL.

From a young age, Bermeo took an interest in music. At eight years of age, she won an inter-school festival with her performances of the songs Fox incaico and Los Andes. She was also selected to be a starting member of the C.S. Emelec sports club's football team.

Bermeo studied Communication sciences at the University of Guayaquil's Faculty of Social Communication for five years, providing for herself by working as a kindergarten assistant teacher or selling morocho.

== Career ==
During her university studies, Bermeo imagined herself as La Hechicera and dreamed of a music career as the character, but her mother forbade it. However, with the money Bermeo had saved, she was able to record and release her first album, Corazon Valiente (Fearless Heart), in 1998. Before this, she was a member of Los Sorceras, an opera group, but decided to go solo. Bermeo would be one of the pioneers of the technocumbia genre and created its dress style, experimenting with the high boots and short skirts that would be adopted by all other technocumbia groups within Ecuador and abroad.

In 2003, Bermeo released the album Hechizo latino (Latin spell), recorded in Argentina and containing the themes of the telenovela La Hechicera under the Leader Music label. Two years later she released Ragga con La Hechicera (Raggae with The Sorceress), becoming the first solo reggaeton musician in Ecuador, then created the technocumbia group Leche y Chocolate in 2005 as well. In 2010, she released the single Poco a poco (Piece by piece).
