= Tecnocumbia =

Music genre

- Stylistic origins: Tex-Mex; mexican cumbia; peruvian cumbia; mariachi; norteña; chunchaca; chicha; techno
- Cultural origins: Integrated various traditional & nontraditional genres during the mid 1980s in Mexico

Tecnocumbia is a style of Cumbia where there is a fusion between electronic sounds generated by electronic musical instruments through electronic drums, the electric guitar, synthesisers, and samplers. "Tecnocumbia" was a word developed in Mexico to describe this type of music. However, the style of music was developed throughout South America with different names given to it before the name "Tecnocumbia" was adopted as the single denomination for the music.

In Mexico, it developed as a variant of the Mexican cumbia that started in the early 1980s. The style added electronic instruments along with samplers to the Mexican cumbia music. One of the first musical groups with electrical 1980s sounds was Super Show de los Vazkez from Veracruz, México, formed in 1981, also, other important exponents were Los Temerarios, Los Bukis, Fito Olivares, among others. These groups created several hits with electrical sounds, their fame continues to the end of the 1980s. In the early 1990s, Selena the "Tex-Mex queen," had great musical hits in U.S. and Mexico, her main hits of the tecnocumbia style was "Como la flor" (Like a flower), "Carcacha" (the old car), and, for first time, this genre was called like "Technocumbia" by her, with the musical hit of same name, "Technocumbia".

In South America, where the Colombian Cumbia most easily expanded in popularity, different "modern" styles of the original Colombian rhythm were started mainly in the countries of Peru, Ecuador and Bolivia. The Peruvian cumbia, developed in the early 1960s, used electric guitars and synthesisers along with the other classical instruments of the Colombian cumbia in order to create a kind of tropical sound. Variations within the Peruvian cumbia added more tropical rhythms along with a more Andean flavor, which eventually resulted in the creation of the Andean cumbia (Commonly called "Chicha music" in Peru). Using the Andean cumbia as a base, in the middle of the 1990s the Tecnocumbia sprung up in Peru and since then has gone through many changes in Peru and Bolivia. Rossy War was the most important singer of the Peruvian tecnocumbia, she recorded several hits for Peru and Mexico, but her fame was bigger in the U.S.A's Latin community. Finally in the north of Argentina the most recent exponents are the group Kasualidad and Lagrimas. In Ecuador, this style of music began in 1992 with Grupo Coctel and; later, in 1999 with Sharon la Hechicera and Widinson. They are considered the beginners of this music in Ecuador. After them male and female groups appeared like Tierra Canela, Magia Latina, Las Chicas Dulces, Deseo, Kandela y Son, Yerba Buena, Milenium, Batahola and others singers like Jazmín, Jaime Enrique Aymara, Hipatia Balseca, Sanyi, Mayra Alvarado, Milena, Enrique Augusto, Manolo and Silvana. Nowadays the most important singers of tecnocumbia are Maria de los Angeles, Gerardo Morán, Patty Ray, Omayra, Veronica Bolaños, Katty Egas and Delfin Quishpe.

In Chile, a similar style is known as Sound or Música Tropical.

The Mexican and South American tecnocumbias have similar styles and rhythms, due to them both having the Colombia cumbia as a base, but they developed through different methods independently of each other and do not sound exactly alike.
