= Châtelperronian =

Proposed Upper Paleolithic European industry

- Map showing the location of La Grotte des Fées, in Châtelperron
- Geographical range: Afro-Eurasia
- Period: Upper Paleolithic
- Dates: c. 44,500–33,000 BP
- Type site: La Grotte des Fées
- Major sites: Châtelperron
- Preceded by: Mousterian
- Followed by: Aurignacian, Périgordian

Selected Châtelperronian sites from the ROAD database (CC BY-SA 4.0 ROCEEH)

The Châtelperronian is a proposed industry of the Upper Palaeolithic, the existence of which is debated. It represents both the only Upper Palaeolithic industry attributed to Neanderthals and the earliest Upper Palaeolithic industry in central and southwestern France, as well as in northern Spain. It derives its name from Châtelperron, the French village closest to the type site, the cave La Grotte des Fées.

The Châtelperronian lasted from c. 44,500 to c. 33,000 BP, and was preceded by the Mousterian industry. The industry produced denticulate stone tools, and a distinctive flint knife with a single cutting edge and a blunt, curved back. The use of ivory at Châtelperronian sites appears to be more frequent than that of the later Aurignacian, while antler tools have not been found. It is followed by the Aurignacian industry.

Scholars who question its existence claim that it is an archaeological mix of Mousterian and Aurignacian layers. The Châtelperronian industry may relate to the origins of the very similar Gravettian culture. French archaeologists have traditionally classified both cultures together under the name Périgordian, Early Perigordian being equivalent to the Châtelperronian and all the other phases corresponding to the Gravettian. The French paleoanthropologist Ludovic Slimak argues that Châtelperronian is a Homo sapiens industry transitional between the Neronian and Proto-Auragnacian.

== Important sites and lithic production and associations ==
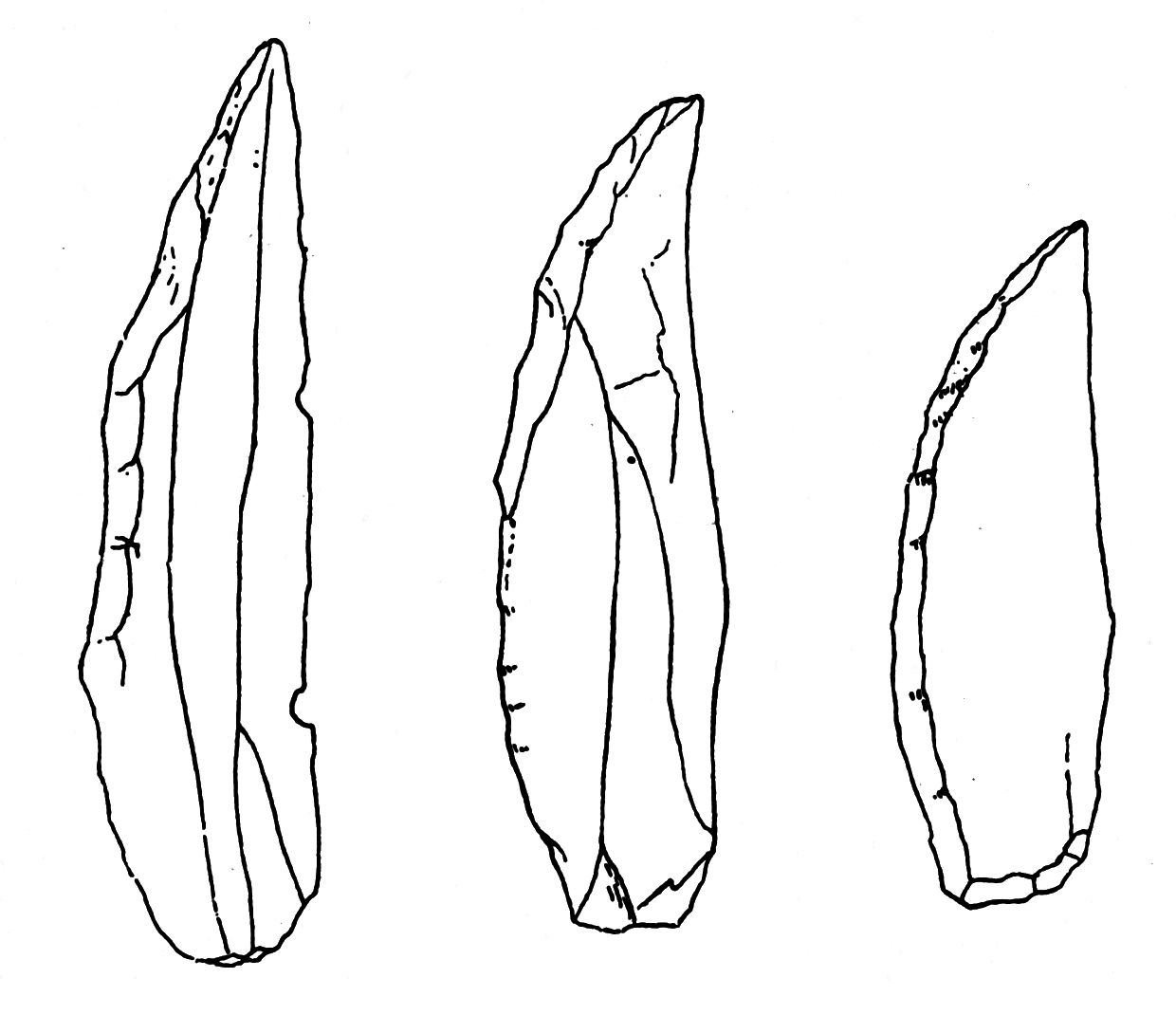
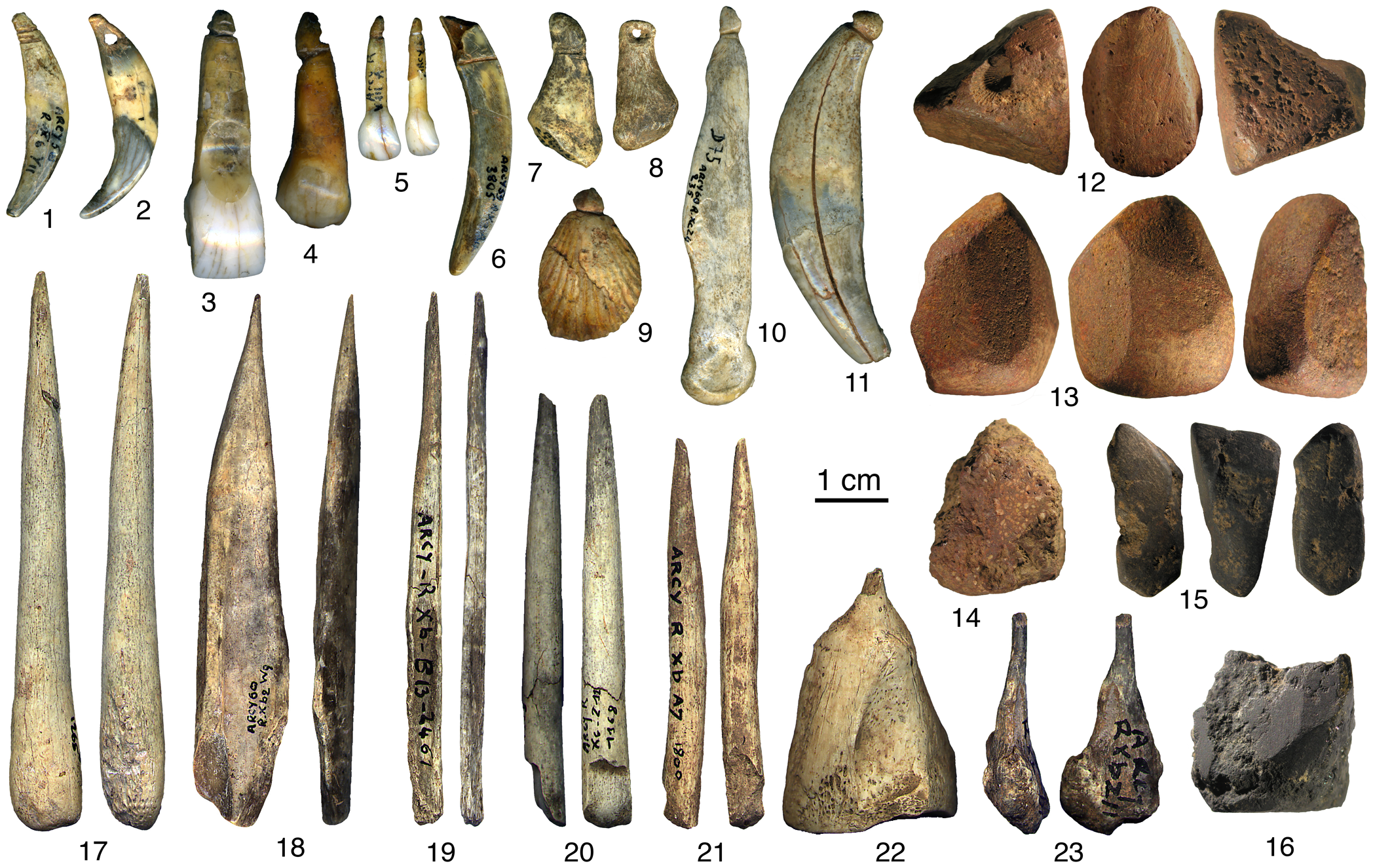
Châtelperronian stone tools (above) and ivory tools and jewellery (below)

Large thick flakes/small blocks were used for cores, and were prepared with a crest over a long smooth surface. Using one or two striking points, long thin blades were detached. Direct percussion with a soft hammer was likely used for accuracy. Thicker blades made in this process were often converted into side scrapers, burins were often created in the same manner from debitage as well.

The manner of production is a solid continuation of the Mousterian but the ivory adornments found in association are similar to those made by the Aurignacian. The technological refinement of the Châtelperronian and neighbouring Uluzzian in Central-Southern Italy is often argued to be the product of cultural influence from H. sapiens that lived nearby, although some scholars believe that this industry represents indigenous biological and cultural development independent to and preceding the arrival of modern populations.

== Dispute over disruption of the site ==
João Zilhão and colleagues argue that the findings are complicated by disturbance of the site in the 19th century, and conclude that the apparent pattern of Aurignacian/Châtelperronian inter-stratification is an artifact of disturbance. Others think the Châtelperronian itself is an artifact of disturbance. Paul Mellars and colleagues have criticized the analysis of Zilhão et al., and argue that the original excavation by Delporte was not affected by disturbance. Paul Mellars, however, now has concluded on the basis of new radiocarbon dating by Thomas Higham of the decorative artifacts of Grotte du Renne "that there was [a] strong possibility—if not probability— that [decorative artefacts] were stratigraphically intrusive into the Châtelperronian deposits from .. overlying Proto-Aurignacian levels" and that "The central and inescapable implication of the new dating results from the Grotte du Renne is that the single most impressive and hitherto widely cited pillar of evidence for the presence of complex “symbolic” behavior among the late Neanderthal populations in Europe has now effectively collapsed." Subsequent research led by Jean-Jacques Hublin argues, using new dates, that the Châtelperronian tools were produced by Neanderthals. Unlike Higham's dates, which were taken directly from the decorative material, Hublin's were taken from associated bones. To Higham, dates taken directly from the decorative material are more convincing and should be given priority over those from associated material. To Hublin, Higham's dates were contaminated with varnish applied to the decorative material in the 1960s. Hublin's team subsequently used proteomic evidence to support their conclusion.

== In popular culture ==
Author Jared Diamond argues in his 1991 non-fiction book, The Third Chimpanzee, that Châtelperron may represent a community of Neanderthals who, to some extent, had adopted the culture of the Early European modern humans that had established themselves in the surrounding area, which would account for the signs of the hybrid culture found at the site. Diamond compares these hypothetical Neanderthal holdouts to more recent Indigenous peoples of the Americas in North and South America, who adopted European technologies such as firearms or domestication of horses in order to survive in an environment dominated by more technologically advanced competitors.

The fifth book of Jean Auel's Earth's Children series, The Shelters of Stone, 2002, and the sixth book The Land of the Painted Caves 2010 are set in this region of modern-day France, during this period.

== Type site ==
The type site is la Grotte des Fées, in Châtelperron.

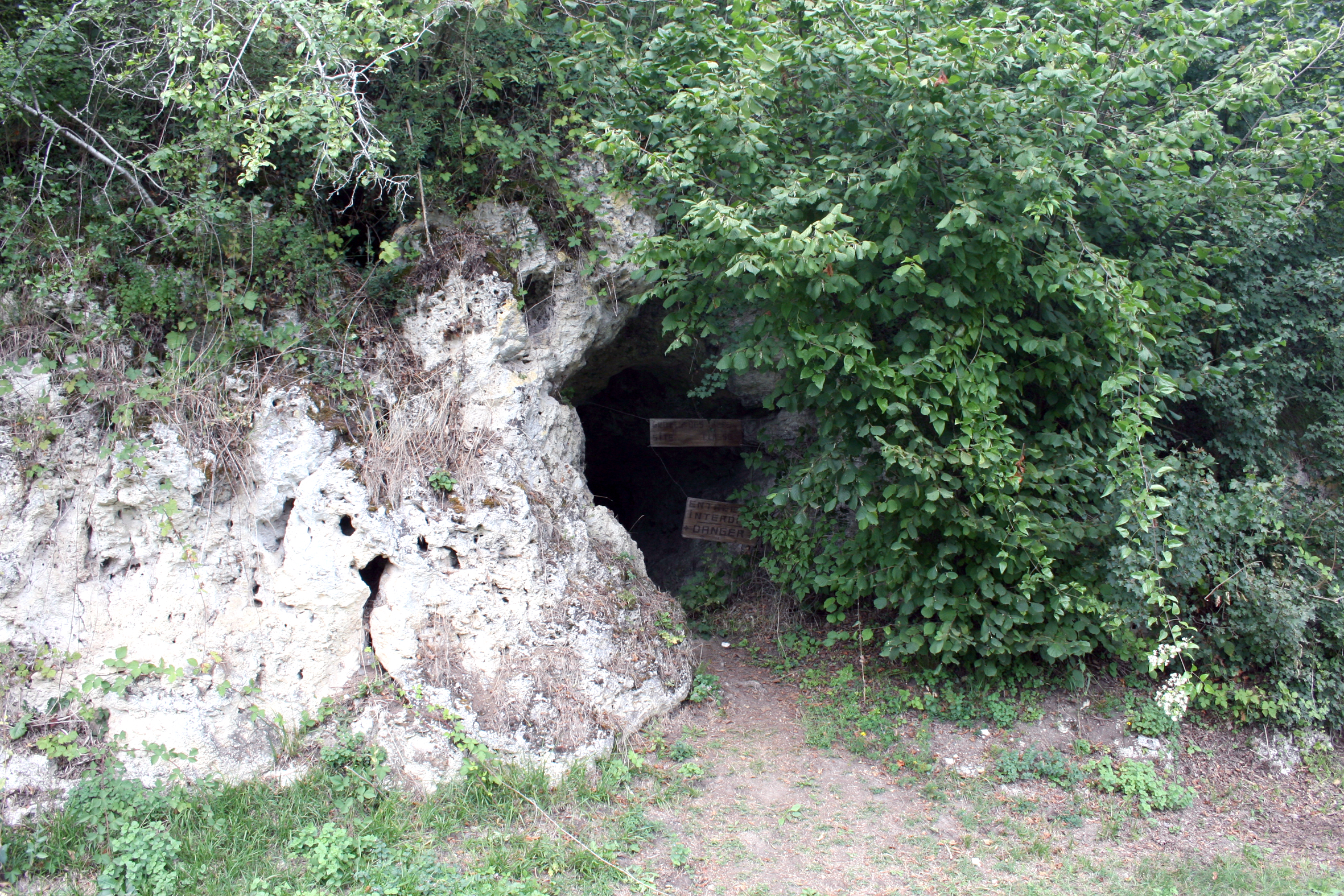

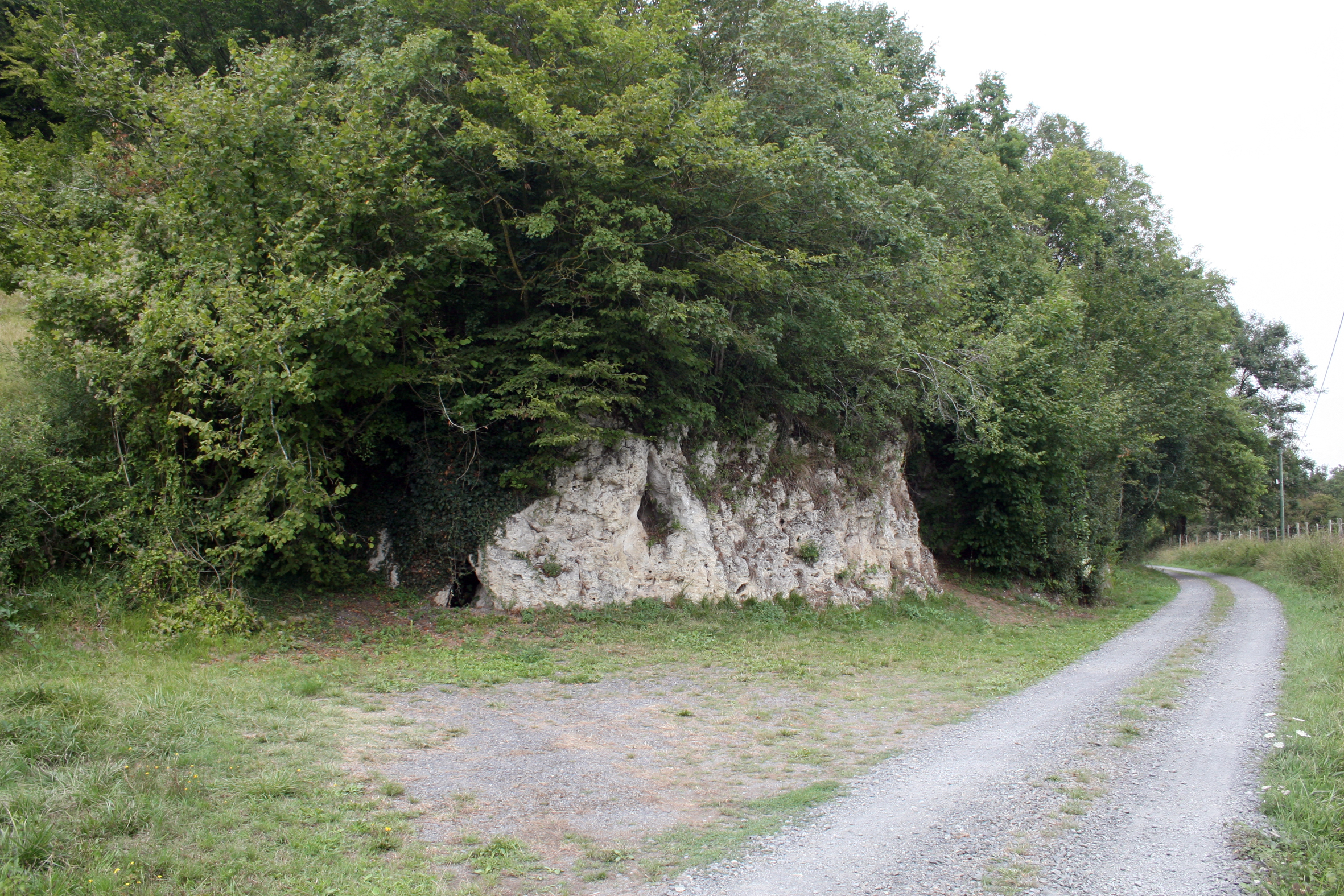

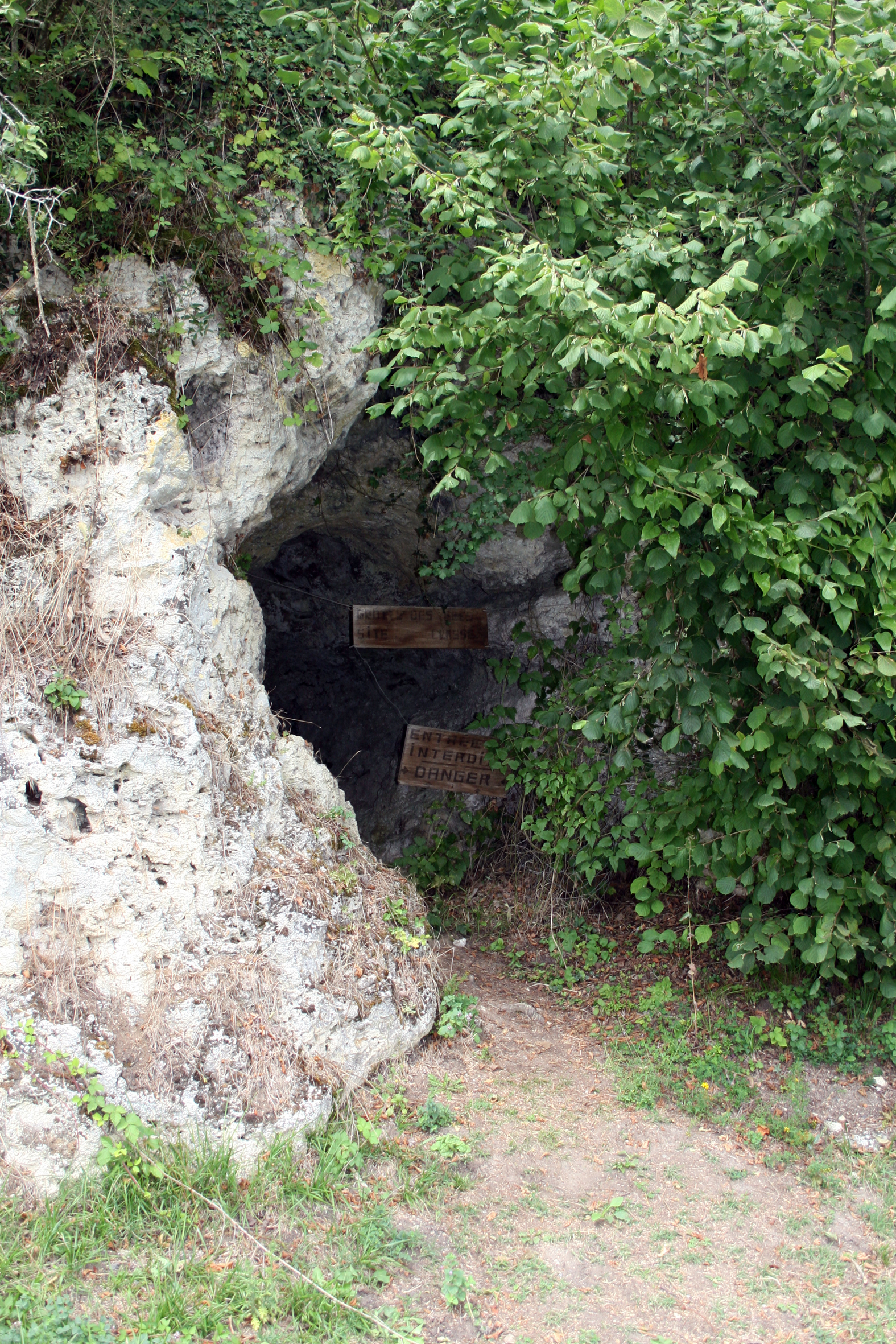

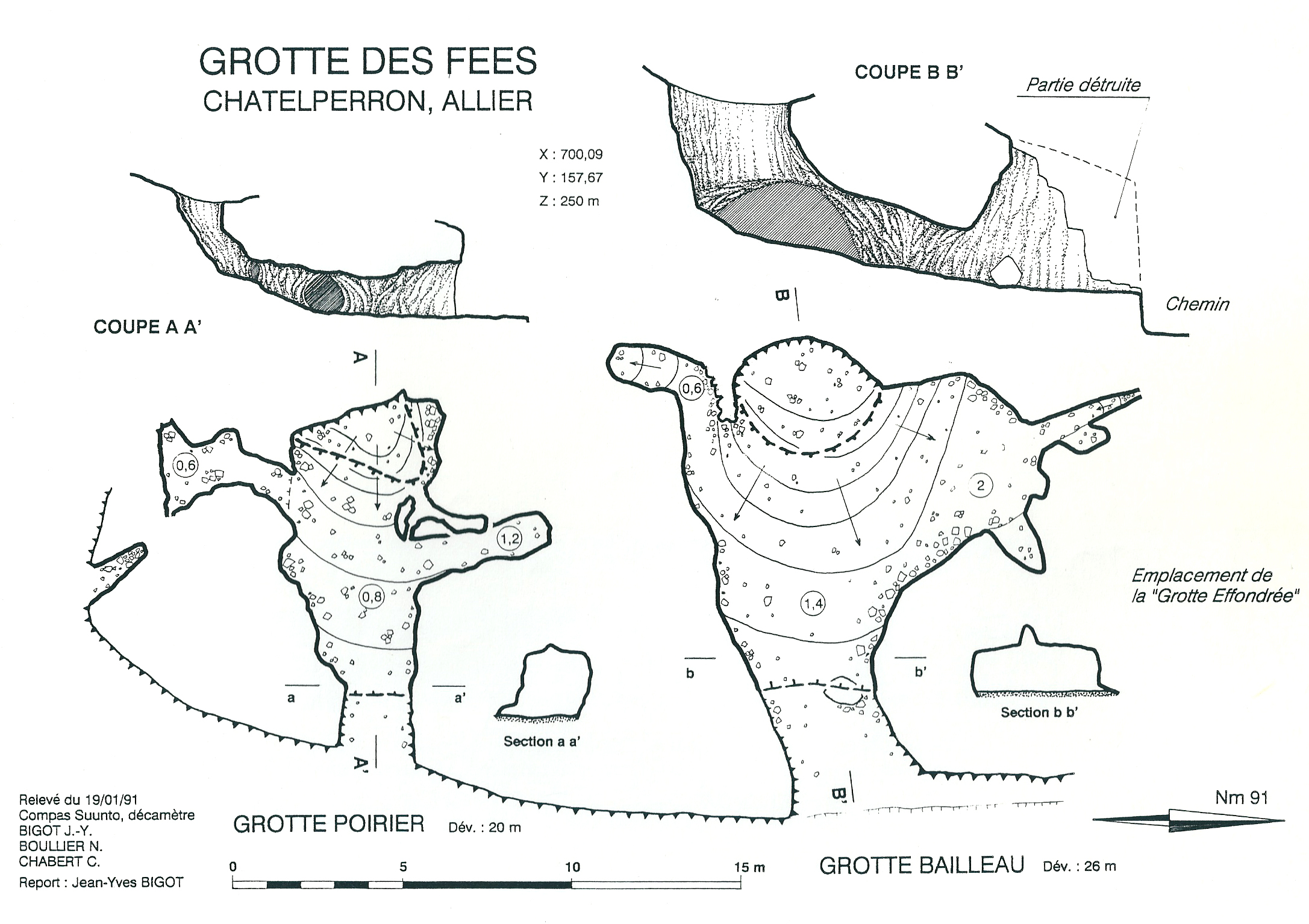
Inside topography

== See also ==
- Franco-Cantabrian region

Preceded by Mousterian	Châtelperronian; 44,500–36,000 BP	Succeeded by Aurignacian
