= Efraín Ruales =

Ecuadorian actor (1984–2021)

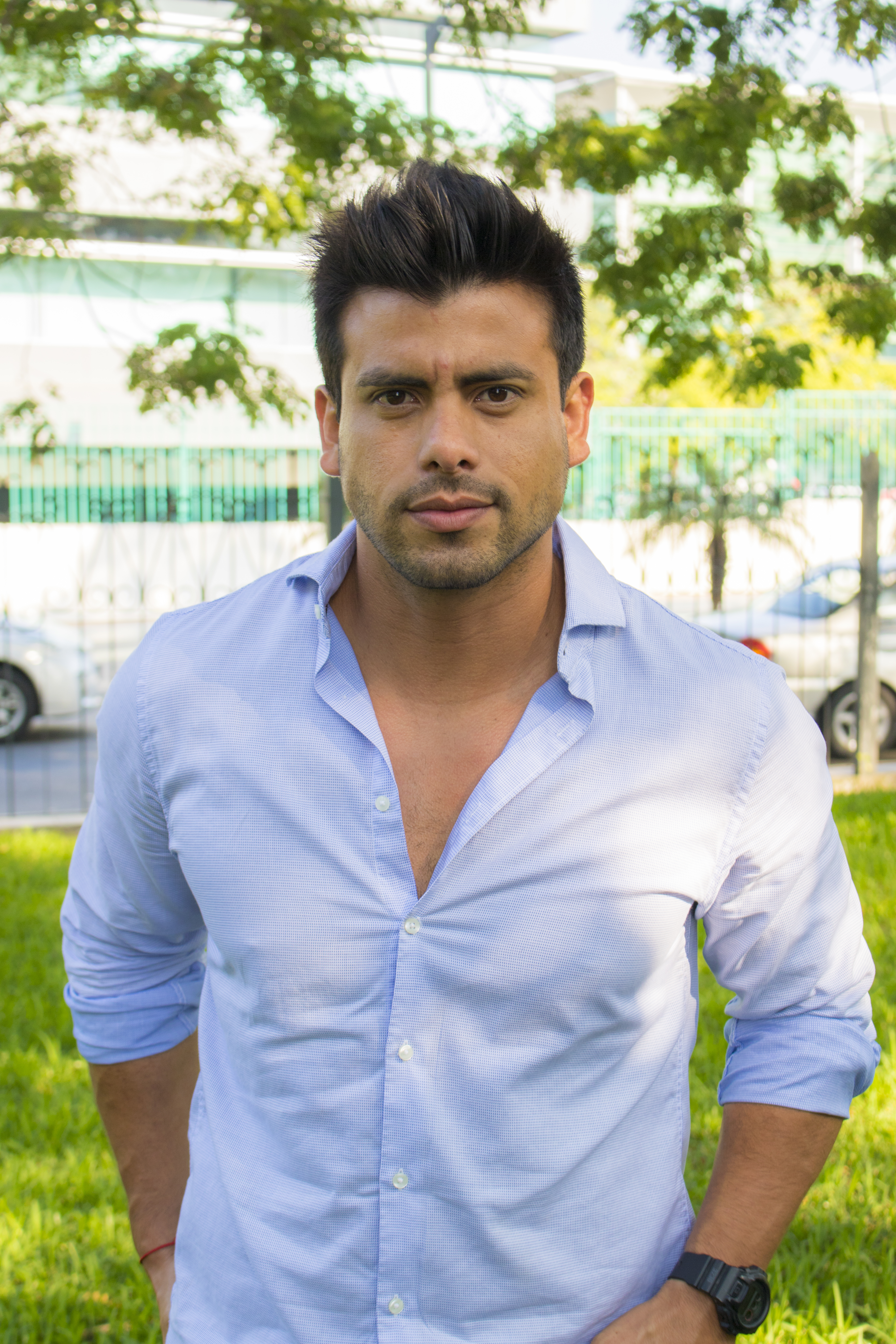
- Ruales in 2018
- Born: Efraín Alberto Ruales Ríos; 31 August 1984; Guayaquil, Ecuador
- Died: 27 January 2021 (aged 36); Guayaquil, Ecuador
- Cause of death: Murder by gunshot
- Years active: 2004-2021

Efraín Alberto Ruales Ríos (31 August 1984 in Guayaquil, Ecuador – 27 January 2021) was an Ecuadorian actor, model, musician and television presenter, known for his appearances in Solteros Sin Compromiso, La panadería, and ¡Así Pasa!, and for his characters Lorenzo, Professor Cachimundo, El Taita and Viperino in the variety program En contacto de Ecuavisa. Ruales was also the bassist for Equilivre and Rokket.

He was murdered on January 27, 2021 by drive-by-shooting at age 36.

== Biography ==
Efraín Alberto Ruales Ríos was born on 31 August 1984 in Guayaquil. At Colegio Salesiano Cristobal Colón, he was a part of the U12 soccer team with Christian Noboa, and he studied Bachelors of Science in Business Administration at Universidad Del Pacífico.

He formed the musical quartet Equilivre, in which he played bass, alongside Erick Mujica (guitar), Fernando Escobar (vocals and second guitar), and Daniel Ballesteros (drums). Ruales, together with Diego Spotorno, created and co-owned Raymi Enterprises, an independent production company that managed their artistic presentations. Under the company, they launched their theatrical show 2 Solteros en Gira, which included a comedy routine. Raymi Enterprises was also in charge of managing Rokket, a band which debuted at the end of the program Ecuador Tiene Talento (Ecuador's Got Talent) on Ecuavisa, with the song Píldora.

=== Television ===
In 2005, Ruales was part of the Ecuavisa series, Pura Boca, and the telenovela Amores que matan. In 2007, he played Benjamin in Solteros sin commitment. In 2008, Ruales and his band Equilivre released the video clip "Cuéntame", with the album Together with you. This album consisted of ten songs played on the telenovela El Secreto de Toño Palomino, in which Ruales was cast as the baker Juan. He also played Wacho in the telenovela The successful Lcdo. Cardoso. In 2009, Ruales was part of the cast on the comic program La Panadería, and in 2011 with La Panadería 2, where he played characters like Dr. Malbaso, El Mijín, Prof. Cachimundo, Sondepueta, El Taita and Lorenzo.

In 2010, he played detective César Muñoz in the TC Televisión soap opera Fanatikda. In 2011, he played Santiago in the comedy series Condominio. Later, he replaced Richard Baker as a presenter on the program De casa en casa. Subsequently, in April 2012, he joined En Contacto with a segment of comedic skits, interpreting his characters from La Panadería, and in May served as presenter after Roberto Angelelli's departure. In 2012, he played Lorenzo. On 20 May 2013, he joined the comic series ¡Así Pasa! as Eduardo Bayas, head of a funeral home. He also played the characters of El Taita, El Poeta and Lorenzo, whom he previously played in La panadería 2 and En Contacto. In that same year he played the role of Alberto "Beto" in the series Veto al feo, a production based on the Colombian telenovela Yo soy Betty, la fea (English: Ugly Betty).

== Death ==
Ruales died on 27 January 2021, at the age of 36, after being shot in his car while leaving a gym in Guayaquil. He was shot four times from another moving vehicle, a target that had been described as difficult to hit without prior training. Robbery was not a motive. The assailant's vehicle was later found abandoned and burned.

A few hours after the event, messages from fans and followers appeared on social networks speculating that he was to be called to testify before the Prosecutor's Office on the day of his murder in the corruption trial of Daniel Salcedo and the family of former president Abdalá Bucaram Ortiz. These accusations were denied by the Prosecutor's office, stating Ruales was never linked to this case, much less should he be summoned to provide any statement.

Ruales was buried in Parque de la Paz cemetery, in La Aurora, Guayaquil.
