= Carolina Jaume =

Ecuadorian actress and presenter (born 1985)

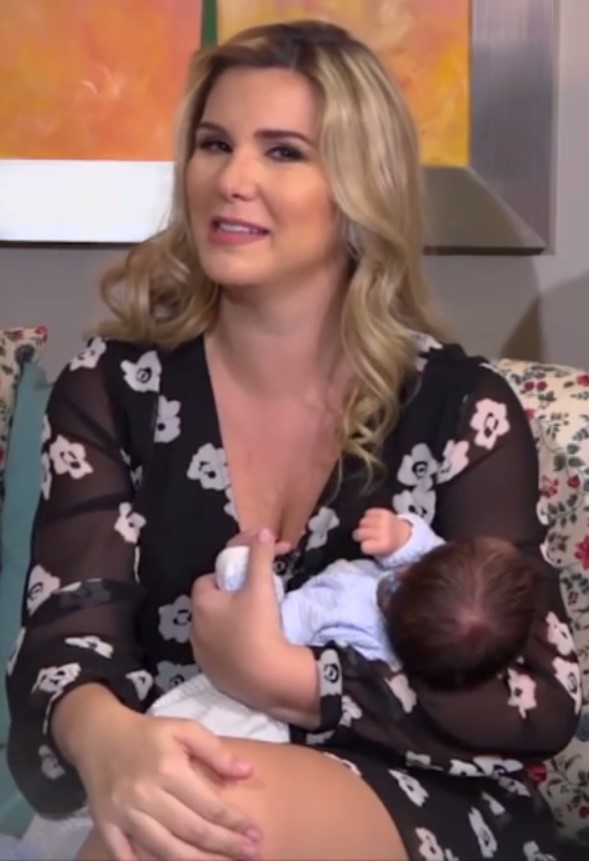
- Born: Carolina Milena Jaume Saporiti; 18 October 1985 (age 40); Guayaquil
- Education: Casa Grande University
- Occupation: Actress
- Spouse(s): Xavier Pimentel (2007–2008); Allan Zenck (2015–2021)

Carolina Milena Jaume Saporiti (born 18 October 1985) is an Ecuadorian television actress and presenter.

== Biography ==
Carolina Jaume was born on 18 October 1985 in Ecuador's largest city, Guayaquil, to parents Rafael Jaume of Puerto Rico and Diana Saporiti, a former television producer from Ecuador. Jaume started early in TV acting, but left during her adolescence until she was 19, when she entered the 2004 Queen of Guayaquil contest, being declared "Star of October." Jaume made her debut into TV acting in 2006 with the Ecuavisa-produced telenovela Amores que matan and the series De 9 a 6, where she worked with Xavier Pimentel, her future husband. In 2007, Jaume would give birth to the couple's daughter, but the marriage ended one year later, in 2009.

In 2008, Jaume starred in the telenovela El Secreto de Toño Palomino and the following year participated in the comedy La Panadería and telenovela El exitoso Lcdo. Cardoso, but left both before completion when she resigned from Ecuavisa. Eventually, she would find herself in Channel One working as a presenter, but would leave Channel One as well in 2015 and marry Ecuadorian businessman Allan Zenck and give birth to another child. From there, Jaume would help in the staging of Mujer que se respeta with Claudia Camposano and Marcela Ruete.

In 2016, Jaume returned to Ecuavisa to be a judge in the fifth season of Ecuador's Got Talent. However, due to a difference of opinion with fellow judge Paola Farias, her contract was not renewed and she left the company a second time.
