= Périgordian =

Several related cultures of the Upper Paleolithic

Périgordien
- Geographical range: Europe
- Period: Upper Paleolithic
- Dates: 35,000 BP – 20,000 BP
- Preceded by: Mousterian
- Followed by: Mesolithic cultures
- Defined by: Denis Peyrony, 1933
- Antiquated by: Denise de Sonneville-Bordes, 1990s

Périgordian is a term for several distinct but related Upper Palaeolithic cultures which are thought by some archaeologists to represent a contiguous tradition. Thought to have existed between c.35,000 BP and c.20,000 BP the Perigordian was theorized by prehistorians (namely Denis Peyrony).

The earliest culture in the tradition is the Châtelperronian which is thought to have produced denticulate tools and flint knives. It is argued that this was superseded by the Gravettian with its Font Robert points and Noailles burins. The tradition culminated in the proto-Magdalenian.

Critics have pointed out that no continuous sequence of Périgordian occupation has yet been found, and that the tradition requires it to have co-existed separately from the Aurignacian industry rather than being differing industries that existed before and afterwards.

== Sites ==
- Font-Robert - (Jalón). Périgordia V.
- Gorge d'Enfer - (Dordogne). Lower and Upper Périgordia.
- La Ferrassie - (Dordogne).
- La Gravette - (Dordogne). Périgordia IV.
- Labattut (Abri) - (Dordogne). Périgordia IV-VI.
- Laugerie Haute - (Dordogne).
- Laussel - (Dordogne) Périgordia IV.
- Le Moustier - (Dordogne).
- Noailles - (Corrèze). Périgord V.
- Oreille d'Enfer - (Dordogne). Périgord V.
- Abri Pataud - (Dordogne). Périgord IV-VII.
- Vignaud (Abri) - (Dordogne). Périgord V.
