= Praileaitz Cave =

Cave and archaeological site in Spain

- Location in Basque Country, Spain
- 43°16′37.2″N 2°22′4.63″W
- Location: Deba, Basque Country, Spain

History
- Built: c. 15,500 years ago

Site notes
- Discovered: 1983 by Mikel Sasieta and Juan Arruabarrena

The Praileaitz Cave (Basque for Rock of the Monk cave) is located in the municipality of Deba (Gipuzkoa, Basque Country).

Early in August 2006, various paleolithic cave paintings were found during an archaeological excavation - a non-figurative iconographic grouping made up of smaller groups of red dots, either isolated or forming a series. Researchers have surmised that the paintings were created around 15,500 years ago.

The cave also yielded an unusual set of portable art on pebbles, with abstract forms that, in one case, suggested to the researchers resembled the Venus figurines found elsewhere in Paleolithic Europe. It was dated to the Lower Magdalenian period of the Cro-Magnon people.

== Protection concerns ==
The cave is located next to the Sasiola Quarry, which presents a threat to the conservation of the paintings.

On May 24, 2007, the Aranzadi Science Society proposed the establishment of a wide protective area around the cave.

On July 17, 2007, the Basque Government adopted (with Ezker Batua and Eusko Alkartasuna voting against) a decree that established a 50-meter protective area around the "rock sanctuary." This level of protection was deemed insufficient by the Aranzadi Science Society, which was in charge of the archaeological excavation and studying the cave paintings.
