= La Grotte des Fées =

Cave and eponymous archaeological site of the Châtelperronian in central France

- Location in France
- 46°24′42″N 3°38′18.6″E
- Location: Châtelperron
- Region: Auvergne-Rhône-Alpes, France

La Grotte des Fées is a cave located in Châtelperron, in the central French department of Allier.

== Description ==
The name refers to three caves, of which one is collapsed.

== Location ==
The caves are located in the commune of Châtelperron, about 1 km north of the town, on the left bank of the Graveron River at 5 or 6 m above stream level.

They belong to the Massif Central.

== History ==
Two interlinked caves were first discovered around 1840, perhaps in 1848, during the construction of the railway which used to link the mines from Bert to Dompierre-sur-Besbre. The first delving research was led by Albert Poirrier, who carried out the construction of the railway line and who had a keen interest in prehistory. A few years later, between 1867 and 1872, Dr. Guillaume Bailleau undertook new research. A third cave (today collapsed), was discovered in 1867 by Bailleau. Several thousand flint blades and mammoth tusks of over 2 metres (6 ft 7 in) long were found. The last research, from 1951 to 1954 and in 1962, was led by Henri Delporte and revealed back blades of flint (named "couteaux de Châtelperron"), burins, drills and scrapers.

Most of the artifacts are today located at the British Museum and at the Philadelphia Museum. A few pieces are on display at the Moulins museum and at the Musée d'Archéologie Nationale at Saint-Germain-en-Laye. The display at Châtelperron (Préhistorama, located in the former railway station) has only reproductions for the time being.

It is to the Grotte des Fées that the Châtelperronian era (35,000–30,000 B.C.) owes its name. Delving results have also sparked the debated theory of the hypothetical cohabitation between anatomically modern humans and Neanderthals.

The site was registered by the French Ministry of Culture as a monument historique in 1949.

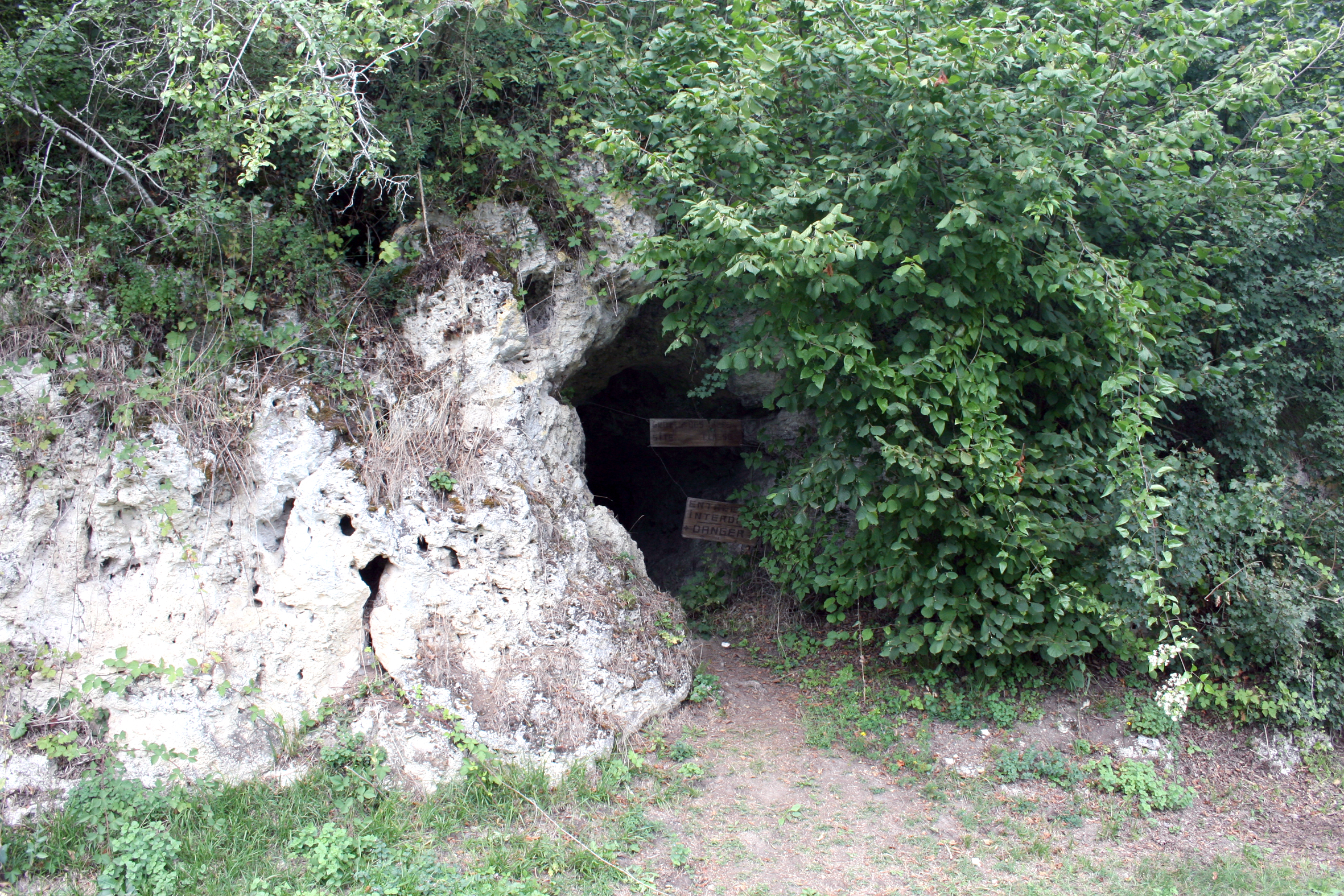

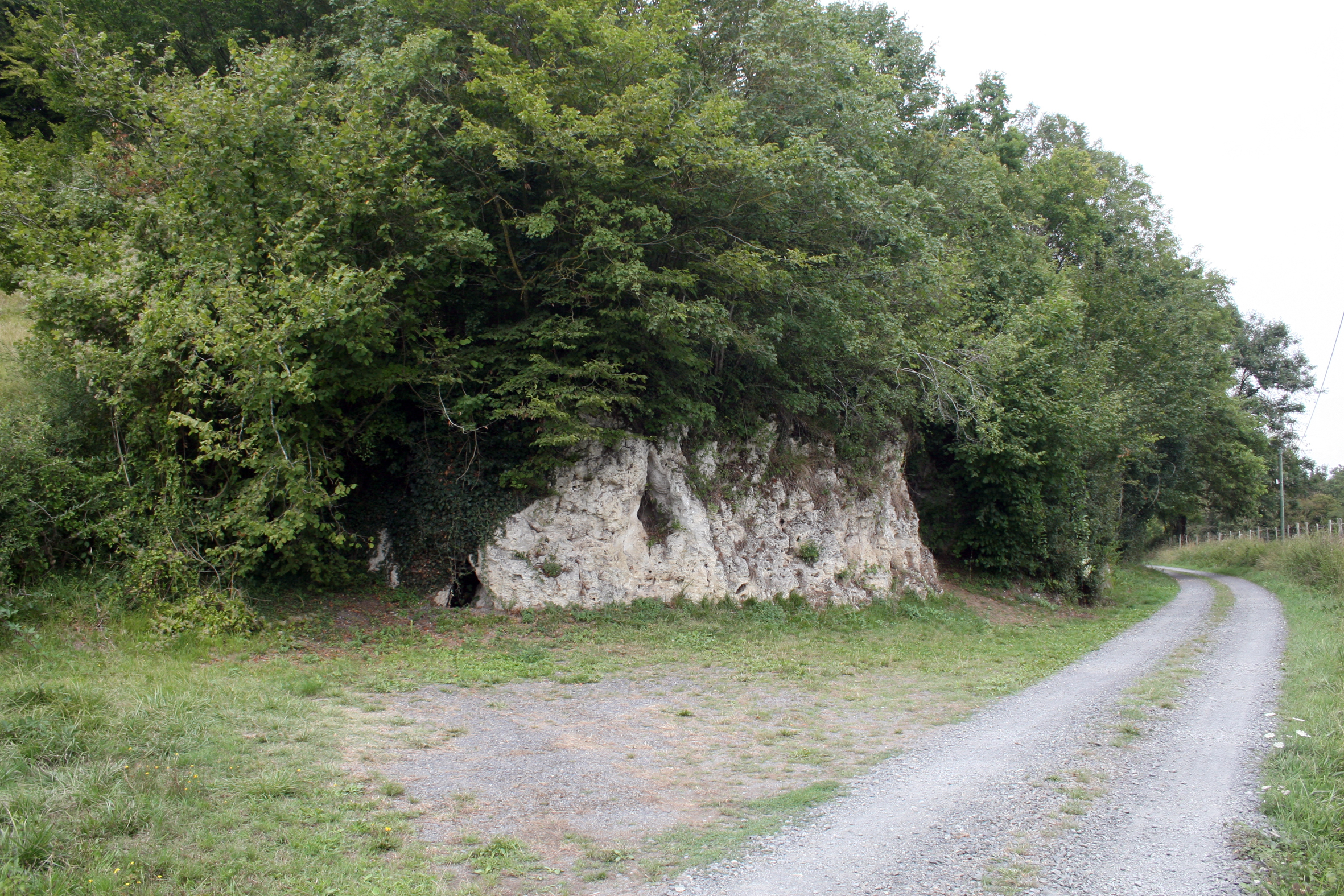

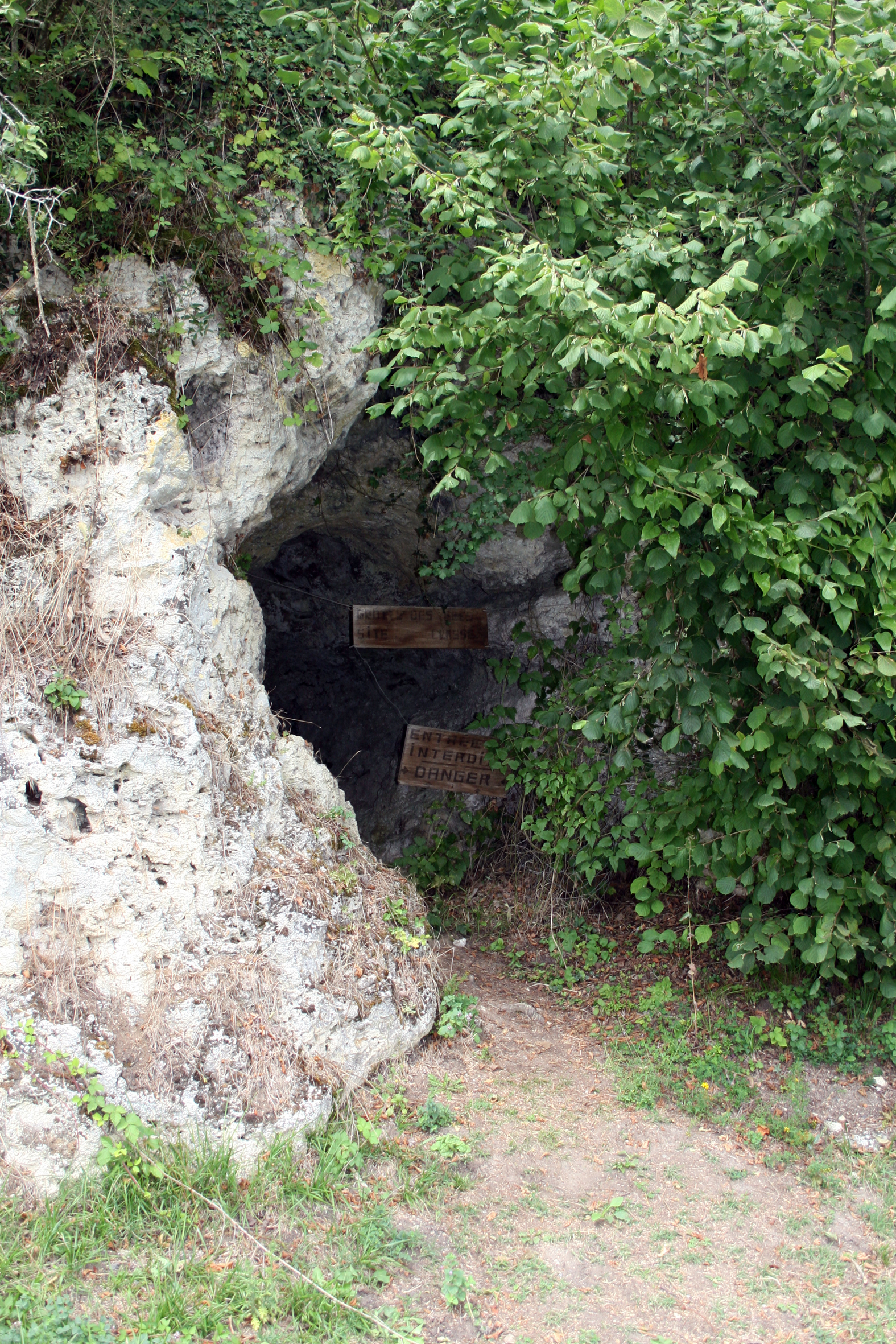

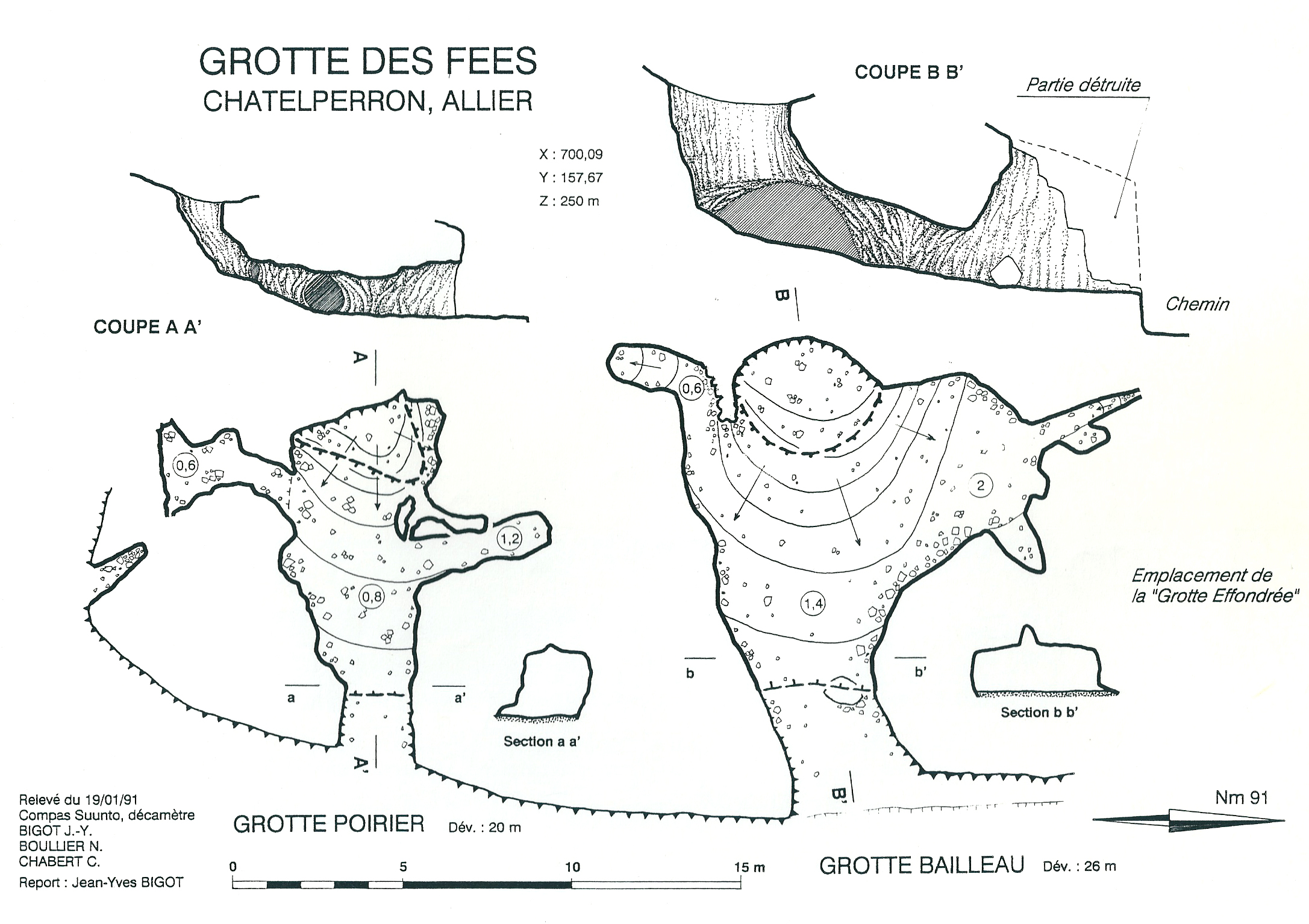
Inside topography
