= Gabriela Pazmiño =

Ecuadorian TV personality (born 1975)

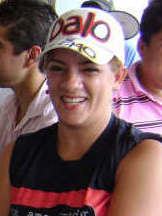
- Pazmiño in 2009
- Born: María Gabriela Pazmiño Pino; 30 July 1975 (age 51); Guayaquil, Ecuador
- Other name: Gaby
- Occupations: Presenter, actress, dancer, politician
- Years active: 1990–present
- Spouse: Abdalá Bucaram Jr. (since 2008)
- Children: 4

María Gabriela Pazmiño Pino, nicknamed Gaby (born 30 July 1975), is an Ecuadorian television presenter, cheerleader, dancer, and politician. She is married to Abdalá Bucaram Jr., with whom she has had four children.

== Biography ==
Gabriela Pazmiño was born on 30 July 1975 in Guayaquil, Ecuador. At fifteen years of age, she entered television in 1990 as a cheerleader on the entertainment program Nubeluz. She was a competitor in Miss Ecuador 1994 and placed as the fourth runner-up. In that same year, Pazmiño appeared on Aquí nos vemos, Miércoles Millonarios, Domingos Millonarios and Guayaquil Caliente. Pazmiño achieved much fame as the host of A todo dar. She was also the presenter for Fama o Drama and La guerra de los sexos. In 2014, she joined the reality show Soy el mejor, which ran for four seasons, ending in October 2015 with her dismissal from TC Televisión. After her dismissal, Pazmiño began a web series on YouTube with her family.

=== Political career ===
In 2007, Pazmiño and her husband were elected to the National Congress of Ecuador for Guayas Province, representing the Ecuadorian Roldosist Party. Two years later, she was elected assembly minister for the province. Of the five assembly ministers elected, Pazmiño had the distinction of having the most absences from her office.
