= Diego Spotorno =

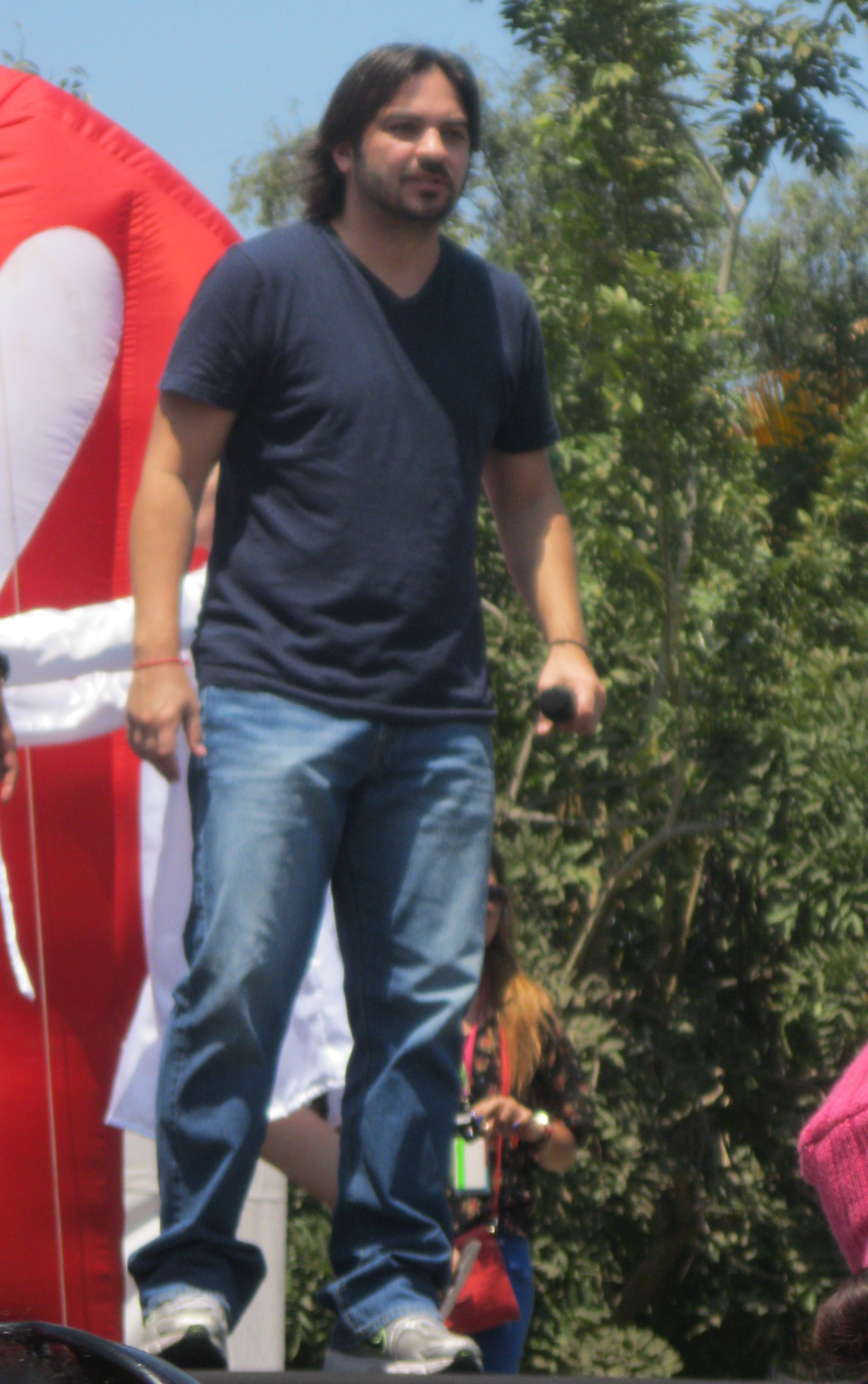
- Diego Spotorno in 2012
- Born: Diego Spotorno Parra; July 13, 1975 (age 51); Guayaquil, Ecuador
- Occupations: Actor, TV host

Diego Spotorno Parra (born July 13, 1975) is an actor and TV host from Ecuador, known for his character Juan Carlos Martinez Cucalón in the comic series Solteros Sin Compromiso.

== Biography ==
Spotorno was born in Guayaquil on July 13, 1975, to an Italian-Argentinian father and a Lebanese mother. He ventured into television for the first time as host of the Iguana Legal then the channel SiTV, then became part of the conduct of Alo que tal America in Telesistema. In 1997, Spotorno was part of the Teleamazonas lead Tour 97.

In 2001, Spotorno was part of TC Televisión team in the comic series Solteros Sin Compromiso, playing Cucalón Juan Carlos Martinez, where he gained fame. He was absent in certain seasons of the series to be part of a Peruvian soap opera called Todo sobre Camila of Iguana Productions and Doctor Amor of Central Park in Argentina. Spotorno was a member of the cast for Cosa seria, serious thing of TC Televisión. After completing the series Solteros Sin Compromiso, he worked for Cabledeportes and was part of the programs of the season, Tour 2007 and Tour 2008, and later lead the Gente Cool program of TC Televisión. Acted for a feature film called Nada Personal.

In 2008, he moved to Ecuavisa acting on the soap opera El Secreto de Toño Palomino, as well serving as the host of En Contacto. In 2009, he starred in El exitoso Lcdo. Cardoso. In 2010, he took a leading role in the soap opera La taxista, as Didi. In 2012, Spotorno was part of the reality show Ecuador Tiene Talento of the British franchise Got Talent as one of the three judges of the contest.
