= Caves in Cantabria =

Caves with prehistoric paintings in Spain

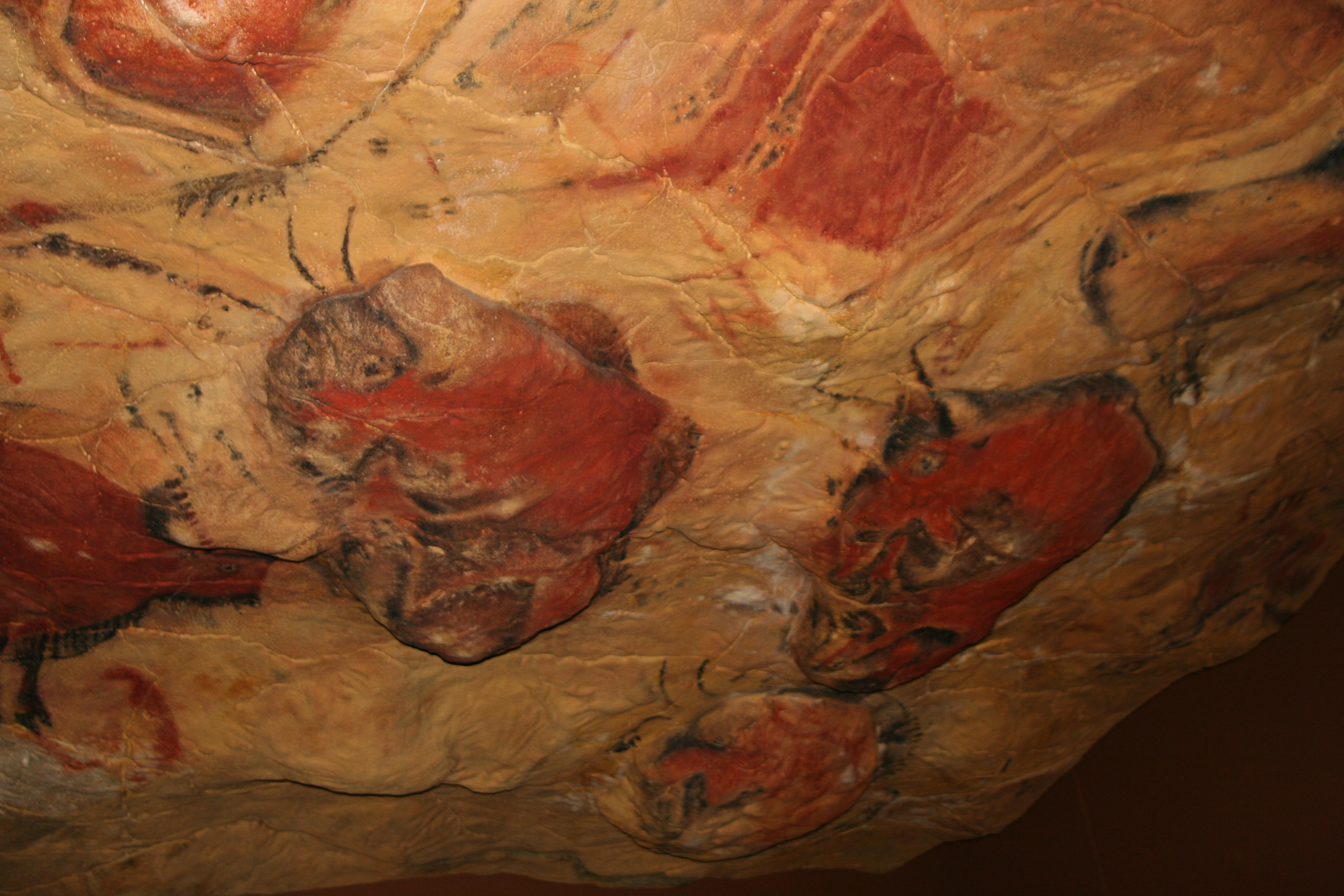
Roof of the Cave of Altamira (replica) - National Archaeological Museum.

The Cantabrian caves' unique location make them an ideal place to observe the settlements of early humans thousands of years ago. The magnificent art in the caves includes figures of various animals of the time such as bison, horses, goats, deer, cattle, hands and other paintings. Archaeologists have found remains of animals such as bears, the remains of arrows and other material indicating a human presence; these artifacts are now found mostly in the Regional Museum of Prehistory and Archaeology of Cantabria.

== With rock art ==
=== Las Aguas ===
The cave of Las Aguas is located near the town of Novales, in the municipality of Alfoz de Lloredo. This cave contains rock art, including two bison carved and painted in red, a doe, a horse, a clavate (club), a sign on the grill and several more configurations. These remains have been dated to the early or middle Magdalenian period.

=== Altamira ===
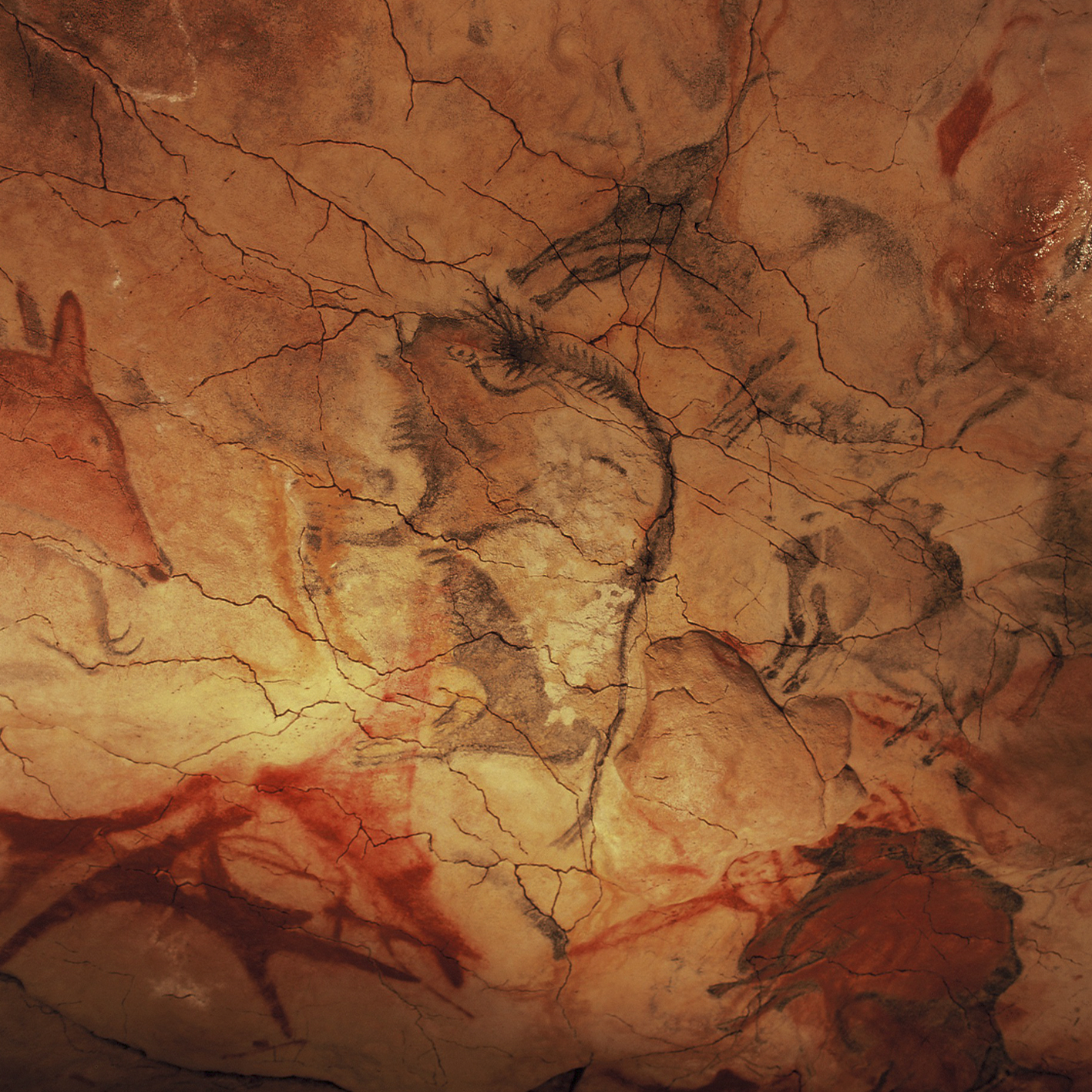
Cave of Altamira and Paleolithic Cave Art of Northern Spain

The Cave of Altamira is located near Santillana del Mar. This cave, called the "Sistine Chapel of Quaternary", is relatively small (270 m (890 ft)) and contains the rock paintings of sixteen bison, several depictions of deer, the largest of which is 2.25 m (7.4 ft) tall and of horses. The cave has been included in UNESCO list of World Heritage Sites since 1985.

=== La Clotilde ===
The Cave of la Clotilde is located in the town of Santa Isabel de Quijas in the region of Reocín. Remains suggest that this area was occupied during the Magdalenian period; its cave paintings date from before the Aurignacian period, which include representations of animals and other symbols of unknown nature.

=== Cualventi ===
The cave of Cualventi is located in the town of Peralada, in Oreña in the municipality Alfoz of Lloredo dating approximately to the Magdalenian age. Several red spots can be found using the techniques of "buffered" and "spot" to depict a huge bison, goats, deer and horses very similar to the Cave of El Pendo, Cave of Covalanas and other Cantabrian caves.

=== Cullalvera ===
Cullalvera Cave is located in the municipality of Ramales de la Victoria, capital of the comarca of Valley of the Asón River. The entry for this cave near the village arises from a Cantabrian oak, and it is part of a karstic complex about 12 km (7.5 mi) in size, in which a multitude of geological forms shaped by water over the course of thousands of years can be found. These forms in conjunction with other prehistoric remains make the cave one of the most visited of the region. Remains of a small reservoir and rock art, both from the Paleolithic have been found here.

=== Chufín ===
The Cave of Chufín is located in the village of Riclones. It is located at the confluence point of several rivers and Nansa Lamasón in an environment with steep slopes amongst other caves with rock art. Chufín contains different levels of occupation, the oldest being around 20,000 years old. Even though the cave is small and of profound simplicity it subtle red paintings of deer, goats and cattle which are represented very schematically and a large number of symbols. One group, called "sticks", accompanies the animal paintings inside the cave. There are also a large number of pointillist drawings, including some around each hole in the rock which have been interpreted as a representation of a vulva. The cave has been declared a World Heritage Site by UNESCO in 2008.

=== La Estación ===
The Cave of La Estación is located near the cave of La Clotilde, in Santa Isabel de Quijas. It is notable for paintings in a large room representing horses and other signs which are not identifiable, dating from about the Aurignacian or Gravettian cultural periods.

=== La Fuente del Salín ===
Fuente del Salín Cave is located in the municipality of Val de San Vicente, and contains an archaeological site discovered in 1985. The path is accessible only in times of drought, because it lies along an underground river. The remains are a reservoir belonging mainly to the Upper Paleolithic, dated to 22,340 years ago by Carbon-14 dating, and also a hearth; rock art and several negative handprint paintings are visible in this room, in addition to positive handprint paintings in other rooms.

=== La Garma ===
The Cave of La Garma is located north of the village of Omoño, in the municipality of Ribamontán al Monte. It was found to wall paintings and fossils in a Lower Gallery, one of the best preserved Magdaleinian period floors. It is part of the Cave of Altamira and Paleolithic Cave Art of Northern Spain World Heritage Site.

=== Hornos de la Peña ===
The Cave of Hornos de la Peña Cave was discovered in 1903 and is situated on a hill near the village of Tarriba, San Felices de Buelna. The most notable paintings are a bird-horse-man at the end of the cave; a headless bison, horse and others at various levels in the first room; the second set of 35 figures consists of animals such as horses, bison, aurochs, goats and others. The paintings were dated to the initial or middle Magdalenian period.

=== El Linar ===
The cave of El Linar is located in La Busta, a town in the municipality of Alfoz de Lloredo. The path is an arroyo of more than 7 km (4.3 mi) with three mouths which join the stream of Busta. Paleolithic materials have been detected and also remnants of Magdalenian era occupations. In one of the galleries is a group of animalistic motifs recorded as goats, bison and ibex. There is also another group of paintings of lines and vulvas and remains of the Bronze Age.

=== Los Marranos ===
The Cave of Los Marranos is located in Venta de Fresnedo, in the municipality of Lamasón; to access the cave, one follows a path that leads to two spring mouths. Geologically, it acts as a drain in times of flooding. It has a spacious entry with rock art. Remains of Paleolithic art are represented mainly by carvings in quartzite. a bronze buckle from the late Middle Ages indicates the possibility that the cave could have served as a shelter for travelers. In 2000, it was declared Bien de Interés Cultural by the Spanish Ministry of Law.

=== La Meaza ===
The cave of La Meaza is located in the municipality of Comillas. On the road to the district of La Molina there is a path leading to the cavity. Findings include the remains of Solutrean, Azilian and even some so-called Asturien evidence, recent prehistoric burials and remains of the Middle Ages. The fact that occupancy has many times explained by the shape of the cave, with a wide entrance and a comfortable lobby to your room. At the bottom of the cavity some remains of Paleolithic rock art framed in the style III of Leroi-Gourhan were found, although they have not been kept too well.

=== Micolón ===
The Cave of Micolón is an archaeological site on the verge of the Palombera reservoir. It is a cavity of 500 m (1,600 ft) length with a particularly narrow labyrinthine structure, in which some flint carvings have been found, such as nodules with signs of having been worked on and a chisel. The remains belong to the Solutrean occupation period, between 20,000 and 17,000 years old. There are several examples of rock art, including 22 rock carvings and several red paintings, basically framed in a room near the entrance. There are deer, horses and tectiform inscriptions, all style III of André Leroi-Gourhan.

=== Monte Castillo ===
The Caves del Monte Castillo include the Cave of El Castillo, the Cave of Las Chimeneas, the Cave of Las Monedas and the Cave of La Pasiega.

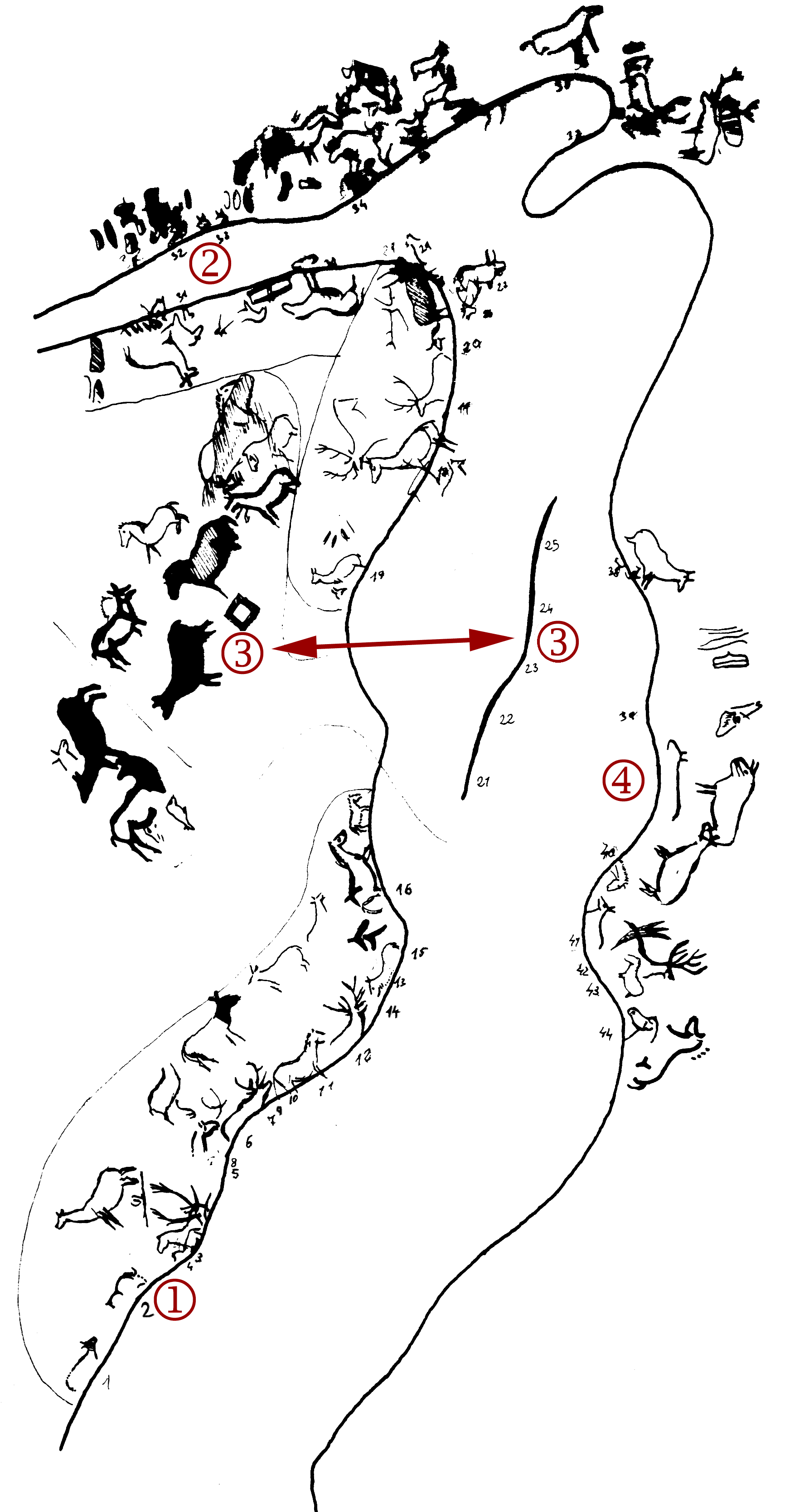
Plan and layout of the rock images of Gallery A, Cave of La Pasiega.

=== La Pavieja ===
The Cave of La Pasiega located in Puente Viesgo is included in the UNESCO schedule of Human Heritage since July 2008, under the citation "Cave of Altamira".

=== Porquerizo ===
The Cave del Porquerizo is in the town of Celis, in the municipality of Rionansa. It is reached by a path leading up from the center of town, which then traverses down a steep slope. There are remnants of the cave's occupation from the Solutrean era, as well as Paleolithic cave paintings, dating between 20,000 and 17,000 years old. There are some rock paintings, in a red pinpoint style, and some indistinct carvings. Its context and its morphology have been classified as a style of Leroi-Gourhan III.

=== El Portillo ===
The cave of El Portillo del Arenal is located in the village of Velo, in the municipality of Piélagos. It contains well-preserved rock art, in addition to pottery fragments and funerary urns.

=== Sovilla ===
The Cave of Sovilla is located in the neighborhood of the same name in San Felices de Buelna and near the cave of Hornos de la Peña. It is characterized mainly by wall paintings that show deer, horses, bison and reindeer from the Magdalenian period.

=== Others ===
- Cave of Arco
- Cave of Las Brujas
- Cave of El Calero II
- Cave of Cobrante
- Cave of Cofresnedo
- Cave of Covalanas
- Cave of El Cuco
- Cave of Cudón
- Cave of Los Emboscados
- Cave of El Haza
- Cave Juan Gómez
- Cave of Juyo
- Cave of La Lastrilla
- Cave of La Llosa
- Cave of Los Moros
- Cave of Del Morro del Horidillo
- Cave of El Otero
- Cave of La Pila
- Cave of El Pendo
- Cave of Peña del Perro
- Cave of Pondra
- Cave Redonda
- Cave of El Salitre
- Cave of San Carlos
- Cave of San Juan de Socueva
- Cave of Santián
- Cave of Sotarriza-Covanegra
- Cave of Sotarraña
- Cave of La Venta de la Perra
- Cave of Urdiales

== Without rock art ==
=== La Chora ===
The La Chora Cave is located in San Pantaleon de Aras and includes a number of chert items as well as flint blades and scraper backs and Magdalenian bone harpoons.

=== Morín ===
Morín Cave or "Cave of the King" is in Villaescusa. Archaeologists have found many items of interest in this site, such as the famous body cast of the so-called "Man of Morín" dating from the Middle Paleolithic. Thanks to the artifacts found in this cave, archaeologists have been able to study the habits of earlier hominids.

=== Ruso ===
Cave of Ruso was discovered in Igollo, Camargo and provided materials from the Paleolithic and Bronze Age which were, as is traditional, moved to the Museum of Prehistory of Santander. There were several ceramic items in the classic beaker culture bell shape and the point of a retouched planar object. The Cave of Juyo has a long sequence of Magdalenian artifacts, though no rock art.

=== El Soplao ===
The Cave of El Soplao is located in the municipalities of Rionansa, Valdáliga and Herrerías. It is admired worldwide for the quality and quantity of geological formations or speleothems contained in its 17 miles in length, although only 6 are open to the public. There are rare formations as helictites (eccentric stalactites defying gravity) and "draperies" (sheets or translucent banners hanging from the ceiling). Its formation dates back to the Mesozoic, in particular the Cretaceous period 240 million years ago.

=== Torca del Carlista ===
Torca del Carlista is located in Cantabria, and contains the fifth-largest underground chamber in the world.

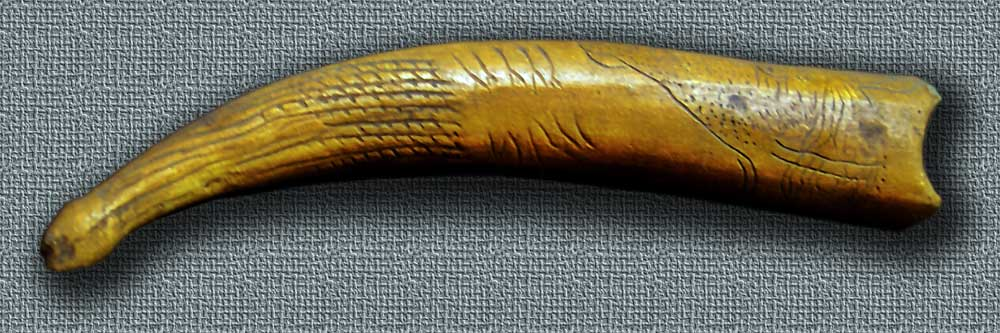
Cane of Cave del Valle.

=== Del Valle ===
The Cave del Valle is located in the municipality of Rasines and also known by locals as "La Viejarrona." It has a majestic entry from which the Silent River springs, a tributary of Ruahermosa, both of Assos. It is an important site, both prehistorically as well as speleologically; it dates to about the Azilian and Upper Magdalenian.

== Chronology of discoveries ==
Name	Date	Discoverer
Cave of Altamira	1879	Marcelino Sanz de Sautuola
Cave del Castillo	1903	Hermilio Alcalde del Río
Cave of El Salitre	1903	Lorenzo Sierra
Cave of Covalanas	September 1903	Hermilio Alcalde del Río
Cueva de La Haza	September 1903	Hermilio Alcalde del Río y Lorenzo Sierra
Cave of Hornos de la Peña	October 27 of 1903	Hermilio Alcalde del Río
Cave of Venta Laperra	1904	Lorenzo Sierra
Cave of La Clotilde	1906	Hermilio Alcalde del Río y H. Breuil
Cave of Sotarriza	August 12 of 1906	Lorenzo Sierra
Cave of Meaza	1907	Hermilio Alcalde del Río
Cave of El Otero	1908	Lorenzo Sierra
Cave of Las Aguas	1909	Hermilio Alcalde del Río
Cave of La Pasiega	1911	H. Obermaier y P. Wernert
Cave of Las Monedas	1952	Alfredo García Lorenzo

== See also ==
- Art of the Upper Paleolithic
- List of Stone Age art
