= José Gutiérrez Solana =

Spanish painter

José Gutiérrez-Solana
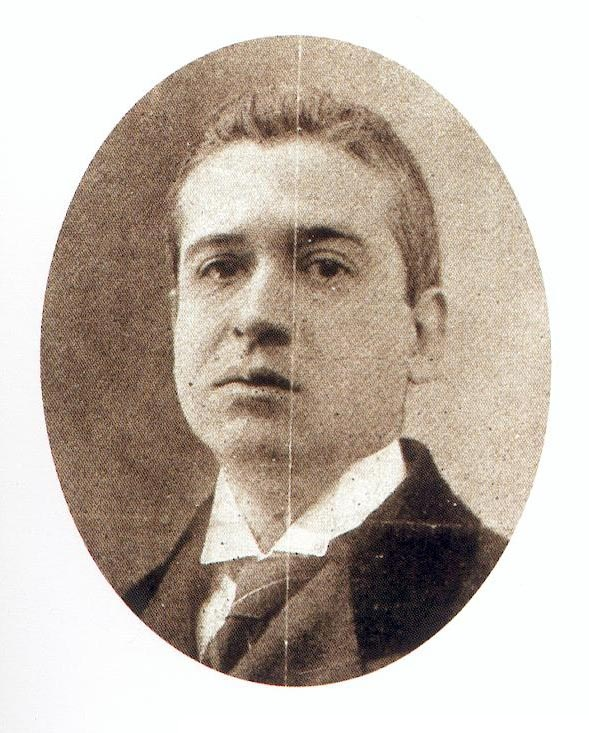
- José Gutiérrez-Solana, c. 1915
- Born: José Romano Gutiérrez-Solana y Gutiérrez-Solana; 28 February 1886; Madrid, Spain
- Died: 24 June 1945 (aged 59); Madrid, Spain
- Education: José Díez Palma (uncle); Escuela de Bellas Artes de San Fernando (1900-1904)
- Known for: Painter
- Movement: Expressionism

José Romano Gutiérrez-Solana y Gutiérrez-Solana (28 February 1886 – 24 June 1945) was a Spanish painter, engraver, and author. He usually signed his paintings as "J. Solana". Generally, he is considered to be an Expressionist, but his style was heavily influenced by El Greco, the Black Paintings of Goya and the works of Eugenio Lucas Velázquez.

== Biography ==
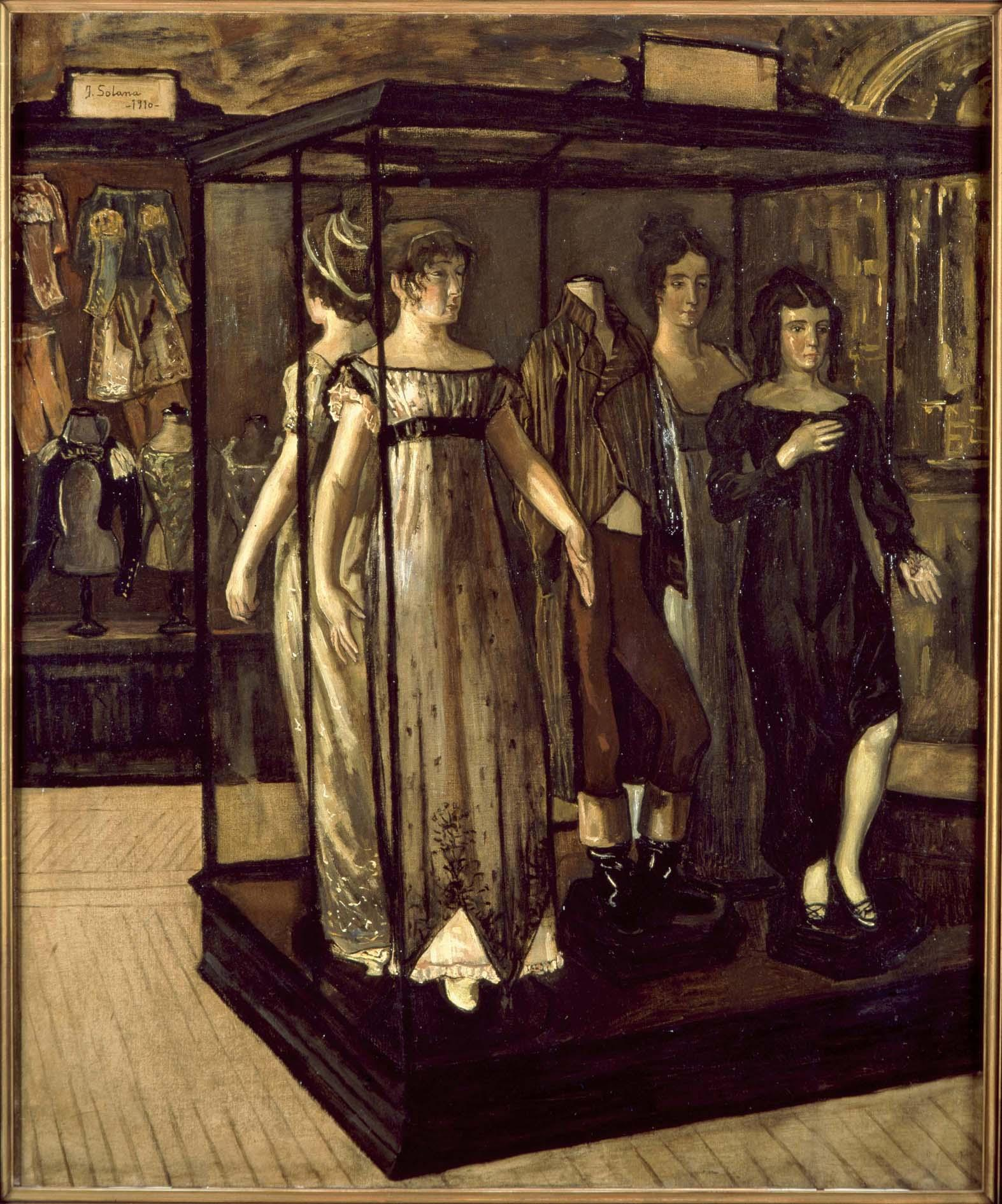
Showcases (1910)

His father was born in Mexico and came to Spain after receiving an inheritance from his relatives in Ruesga; marrying a cousin from Arredondo. His first lessons came from his uncle, José Díez Palma, who was a professor of drawing at the University of Salamanca. From 1900 to 1904, he studied at the Escuela de Bellas Artes de San Fernando and, in 1906, received honorable mention at the Exposición Nacional de Bellas Artes.

In 1909, his parents moved to Cantabria, so he divided his time between Santander and Madrid. He also made frequent trips to La Mancha, Aragón and Andalucía, making sketches and notes as he went to the carnivals and visited the cemeteries, hospitals and bordellos; deriving great inspiration from the mobs at El Rastro, the market in Madrid. Well-supplied with money from his father, he took singing lessons, attended the theater and developed a great passion for the bullfights. At one point, he became an assistant in the cuadrilla (team) of the torero "Bombé".

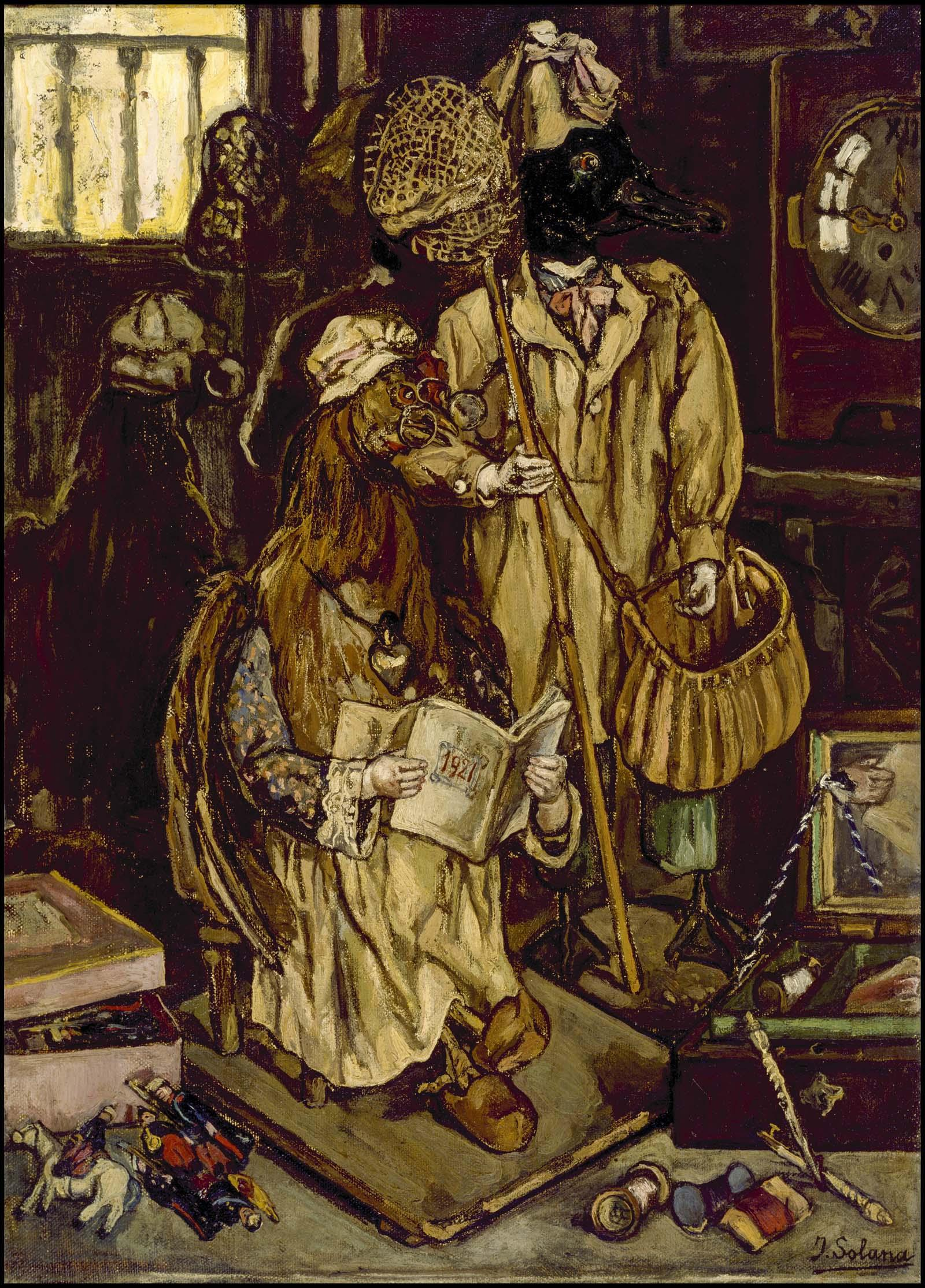
Birds (1921)

Eventually, he settled in Madrid in 1917, where he frequented the parks, the Museo del Prado and the National Archaeological Museum. He became a regular at the Nuevo Café de Levante, where he associated with Ramón del Valle Inclán, Ricardo Baroja, Julio Romero de Torres, Ignacio Zuloaga and other members of Generación del '98. He also attended the tertulias at the Café Pombo, presided over by Ramón Gómez de la Serna, where he met with fellow painters, writers and other notable intellectuals, including Francisco Iturrino, Manuel Abril, José Bergamín and Tomás Borrás. It was during this period that his personal style found full expression.

In 1928, he held his first showing in Paris, which turned out to be a failure. At another exhibition, his paintings were hung behind large doors, so they would not "bother" King Alfonso XIII when he came for a visit. By 1936, however, at the beginning of the Spanish Civil War, he had achieved fame throughout Europe. At that time, he went to Paris, following a brief stay in Valencia. After the war, he returned to Madrid, where he remained until his death.

In addition to his paintings, he wrote several books; mostly accounts of his travels and descriptions of local customs. In 1926, he wrote a novel: Florencio Cornejo.

== Selected writings ==
- La España negra, 1920. Reprinted by Forgotten Books, 2015 ISBN 1-332-4646-7-X
- Madrid: escenas y costumbres (2 Vols., 1913 and 1918) Full text of Vol.2 @ Google Books. Reprinted by Trigo Editions ISBN 84-89787-46-8
- Madrid callejero, 1923. Reprinted by Trigo Editions ISBN 84-89787-46-8
- Florencio Cornejo, 1926. Reprinted by Creatica, 2011 ISBN 84-952105-8-4
