= List of caves in Spain =

The following is an incomplete list of caves in Spain:

== Overview ==
Spain is a country with many caves. Among the best-known Spanish caves are:

- Cave of Altamira, in Cantabria, famous for its Upper Paleolithic paintings.
- Cuevas del Drach, on Mallorca, containing one of the largest subterranean lakes in the world.
- Grotte Casteret (Gruta Helada de Casteret), a limestone ice cave discovered by Norbert Casteret and family.
- Ojo Guareña, an enormous subterranean karst system, second only to the Mortillano system in terms of length.
- Caves of Nerja, partially open to the public, with many prehistorical paintings of animals.

== Caves by depth (m) ==
- -1.589 m Torca del Cerro del Cuevón - Torca de la Saxifragas (Asturias)
- -1.507 m Sima de la Cornisa - Torca Magali (León)
- -1.441 m Sistema del Trave (Asturias)
- -1.410 m Gouffre de la Pierre Saint-Martin (Zuberoa, France - Navarre, Spain)
- -1.349 m (-1.338+11) Sistema Arañonera (Foratón/S-1/Camí de l'Ara/T-1/Santa Elena) (Huesca)
- -1.340 m Illaminako Ateeneko Leizea (BU.56) (Navarre/Huesca)
- -1.327 m Sima del Sabbat (Huesca)
- -1.264 m Sistema del Jitu (Asturias)
- -1.255 m Torca de los Rebecos (T.27) (Asturias)
- -1.252 m Pozo del Madejuno (León)
- -1.203 m Torca Jou sin Tierre (CS-9) (Cantabria)
- -1.187 m Piedras Verdes (PC-26) (Asturias)
- -1.169 m Torca del Cueto de los Senderos (Cantabria)
- -1.167 m Torca Idoúbeda (Asturias)
- -1.151 m Sistema de klas fuentes de Escuain (Sistema Badalona) (Huesca)
- -1.112 m (-1101+11) Sistema de las Nieves (Málaga)
- -1.102 m Sistema Tormenta - La Texa (Asturias)
- -1.053 m Torca La MONDA (L652) (León)
- -1.028 m Sistema Castil/ Carbonal (Asturias)
- -1.022 m (-1017 +5) Torca Urriello (Asturias)
- -1.009 m Sistema de Lechineres (Huesca)
- -993 m Torca Tortorios (Asturias)
- -986 m Pozo de Cuetalbo (M.2) (León)
- -974 m Torca del VALLE DEL AGUA (Asturias)
- -957 m Sistema de CEMBA VIEYA (Asturias)
- -956 m Sistema del Jou de la Canal Parda (A.30- A.24 - A.25 - A.1) (Asturias)
- -950 m Sistema de Garma Ciega-Bloque-Cellagua-Sombrero-Mazo Chico- (Cantabria)
- -949 m (-944, +5) Pozo del Llastral (León)
- -943 m Torca Marino (León)
- -939 m Pozu de Cabeza Muxa (Asturias)
- -930 m Pozo Vega Huerta (M921) (León)
- -912 m Torca del Jou de Cerredo (Asturias)
- -905 m Pozu JULTAYU (Pozo del Ojo de la Bruja/27) (Asturias)
- -902 m Sistema GÜEYO FRESCO / ESPELUNGA del MEDIODIA (Huesca)
- -863 m Pozu del Porru la Capilla (Asturias)
- -853 m Sistema ANIALARRA (AN.51-AN.3-AN.6) (Navarre)
- -843 m Sima de los Hoyos de la Yesca (FA 32) (Cantabria)
- -836 m Sima de la Padiorna (Cantabria)
- -831 m Torca del Cueto de los Calabreros (Cantabria)
- -829 m Sistema Cueto Coventosa (Cantabria)
- -825 m Sistema Partacua (P-6) (Huesca)
- -819 m Sima AN8 (AN.8-AN.9) (Navarre)
- -814 m Sistema del Gándara (Cantabria)
- -806 m Torca de Cabeza Llambrera (MS 42) Sil de Olidesa (León)
- -803 m Torca LA HORCADINA (L.6) (León)
- -803 m Sima PRESTÁ (Málaga)
- -798 m Pozo BAJO DEL SEDO (León)
- -792 m Torca de la MINA TERE (Cantabria)
- -758 m Torca TEJERA (Asturias)
- -736 m Torca de CARNIZOSO (CZ.3) (Asturias)
- -736 m Sistema del CANALON DE LOS DESVIOS (F.15 -F.17-F.18- Pozo B-12) (Asturias)
- -727 m (-690+37) Sima de COTALBIN (K-903) (León)
- -723 m Torca del PICU BORU (T169) (Cantabria)
- -717 m Sima de UKERDI ABAJO (UK.4) (Navarre)
- -714 m (-607 +107) Cueva BUCHAQUERA (Huesca)
- -690 m Torca LLOROSA (Asturias)
- -682 m Torca de la NIEVE (2N) (Cantabria)
- -675 m Pozu JOCEJERRERU (Asturias)
- -660 m Sima J.A.17-J.A.18 (Asturias)
- -655 m Sistema del CONJURTAO (Asturias)
- -654 m Pozo los JOYOS de CUEVA PALACIOS (Asturias)
- -650 m Pozo de la CELADA (León)
- -650 m Sima del AIRE (Málaga)
- -650 m FISURA CHICA (Asturias)
- -644 m Sistema de la VERDILLUENGA (C.3) (Asturias)
- -644 m Sistema de la MINA SARA (Cantabria)
- -640 m Grallera de PICO FENEZ (Huesca)
- -640 m Pozu los GORRINOS-Pozu'l PRAU LA FUENTE (Asturias)
- -634 m Pozu'l TRAVE ROLAMUELA (Asturias)
- -622 m (-412, +210) Sistema del MORTERO DE ASTRANA (Cantabria)
- -619 m Pozu del JOU LUENGU (Asturias)
- -614 m Red de TONEYO (Asturias)
- -613 m Torca del LLAGU LAS MOÑETAS (Asturias)
- -608 m Torca de la TORRE DE ALTAIZ (Cantabria)
- -605 m Sistema del ALTO TEJUELO (Red del Alto Tejuelo-Riañón-los Moros-Cotero-la Canal-Torcón del Haya) (Cantabria)
- -604 m Grallar de SARRONAL (Huesca)
- -601 m Sima A-8 de Armeña (Huesca)
- -598 m Grallera del TALLON (Huesca)
- -597 m Pozu CEBOLLEDA (Asturias)
- -594 m Pozu JORCADA BLANCA-Pozu LAS PERDICES (Asturies)
- -594 m Torca del MOGU (JI.9) (Asturias)
- -589 m Torca de LAS PASADAS (Cantabria)
- -585 m Pozo de la AGUJA de ENOL (Asturias)
- -582 m Pozu del REDONDU (Asturias)
- -580 m Sistema SABADELL (Huesca)
- -576 m ORMAZARRETAKO Leizea II-LARRETXIKIKO LeizeaII (Navarre)
- -571 m Sistema de la BARGADERA (Lleida)
- -570 m Torca del SOTANO de la XANA (T.31) (Asturias)
- -563 m Sistema FÉLIX RUIZ DE ARCAUTE (Huesca)
- +562 m Cueva de la Nacimiento (Rio Urdon) (Cantabria)
- -547 m ILOBIKO LEZEA (Navarre)
- -546 m Sistema del ALBA (Huesca)
- -545 m Pozu de les CUERRIES (Asturias)
- -540 m Pozu de la TORRE DE ENMEDIO (Asturias)
- -535 m Sistema de la BRECHA DE ROLANDO (CS.8/TP.8) (Huesca)
- -532 m (-487+45) Cueva del HOYO SALCEDILLO (Cantabria)
- -530 m (-483+47) Torca del HOYO GRANDE (Cantabria)
- -527 m Sistema TONIO-CAYUELA (Cantabria)
- -527 m Complejo ATXURIAGA (sistema Artekona-Arenaza-Rosario 5) (Biscay)
- -522 m GAZTELUKO URZULOA I (Gipuzkoa)
- -522 m Sima del RIO DE UKERDI (Sima del Tobozo) (Navarre)
- -518 m Complejo VIENTO-SOBRADO (Sta. Cruz de Tenerife-Canarias)
- -517 m Sima del ACEBO (Cantabria)
- -510 m LANS (Navarre)
- -508 m Grallera del PUERTO DE GISTAÍN (Huesca)
- -507 m Torca M`ECAGÜEN (T.7) (Asturias)
- -505 m Sumidero del HOYO SALZOSO (Cantabria)
- -503 m Sima de la KIETUD (Huesca)
- -501 m Sima BUFONA (Huesca)
- -501 m Sima del Tejón (Cantabria)
- -497 m Sistema TIBIA - FRESCA (Cantabria)
- -490 m Pozu del PORRU de los GAZAPOZALES ( Pozu A.3) (Asturias)
- -488 m MAIKUTXEKO Leizea (Gipuzkoa)
- -483 m Torca de JORNOS II (Biscay)
- -477 m Cueva del VALLE (Red del SILENCIO) (Cantabria/Biscay)
- -476 m Torca del Brana Espina (Cueva C29) (Cantabria)
- -471 m Torca de la MOLE (Cantabria)
- -465 m Pozo SILVESTRE - Cueva de la MARNIOSA (Cantabria)
- -460 m Sima A.11 DE ARMEÑA (Huesca)
- -460 m A.55 de ARMEÑA (Huesca)
- -460 m C.166 Cotiella (Huesca)
- -457 m (-451+6) Sistema de la PUNTA DE LAS OLAS (Huesca)
- -457 m (-423+34) Pozo de los ANGUSTINOS (León)
- -456 m Torca de BRAÑARREDONDA (Cantabria)
- -455 m Simas FREU.3-Sima FR.3 DE AÑELARRA (Navarre)
- -453 m (-415 m, +38 m) Torca de los MORTEROS (Burgos)
- -452 m Torca de la HENDIDA ( S-33 ) (Cantabria)
- -450 m Torca’l TUBU (JA-30) (Asturias)
- -450 m (-432+18) Sima del FUEGO (F.64) (Asturias)
- -449 m Cueva del VIERRO (Asturias)
- -444 m GAZTELU ARROKO Leizea III (Gipuzkoa)
- -440 m El MORTERÓN (Morterón I del Hoyo Salzoso) (Cantabria)
- -436 m (+3 / -433) Torca de los CORRALES DEL TRILLO (Sistema Peña del Trillo - La Tramasquera) (Cantabria / Burgos)
- -430 m Pozu GRANDE DE LA TORREZUELA (Asturias)
- -429 m Pozu les BARRASTROSES (G-13) (Asturias)
- -425 m (-420+5) Sima de LEIZEROLA (Z.17) (Navarre)
- -420 m Sima de la GARITA CIMERA (León)
- -420 m Torca del HOYO MEDIO (Cantabria)
- -419 m Pozo REBECA (p103) (León)
- -418 m Cueva de la HAZA (Cantabria)
- -418 m Pozu de la PORRA ALTIQUERA (Asturias)
- -415 m Cueva del FRAILE - Sima de la TARTRACITA (Huesca)
- -415 m Sistema del HAYAL DE PONATA (Álava-Biscay)
- -410 m Pozo de los NIÑOS (AN.506) (Navarre)
- -410 m Sima FORATATA (Huesca)
- -409 m Sumidero de LAS FOYAS (Huesca)
- -407 m Torca C (Torca del Camino) (Provisional) (Asturias)
- -403 m Pozu CHIZIDI (Sistema YA.1-HR.2) (Asturies)
- -402 m ORMAZARRETAKO Leizea I (Navarre)
- -402 m Sima del CORRAL CIEGO (DC.7) (Huesca)
- -402 m Torca de la HORCADA VERDE (Cantabria)
- -401 m Sima de los CUATRO CAMINOS (K.897) (León)
- -401 m Sima de MARBORE (Huesca)
- -400 m Sima de la HOYA DEL PORTILLO DE LARRA (Huesca)
- -400 m Sima de la PALANCA (León)
- -400 m Sistema de la CUBADA GRANDE (Burgos)
- -400 m TR.1 (Cantabria)
- -400 m Torca de la Cuerre (Cantabria)
- -396 m Sima de la BURRA (Navarre)
- -394 m Torca de la Canal del Valle (Cantabria)
- -390 m Torca del CARRIO (Cantabria)
- -387 m Sima de los CAMPANALES (Huesca)
- -385 m Pozo la LLERONA (León)
- -385 m Pozo de LEIZEROLA (Z.150) (Navarre)
- -383 m Sistema APESTEGIA (Navarre)
- -381 m Pozo de la REDONDINA (MS.2) (León)
- -380 m Sima del CABALLERO DE LA TRISTE FIGURA (Huesca)
- -376 m Torca la VEGA ALISEDA (del Vasco) (Asturias)
- -374 m Sima de las CHOVAS (Palencia)
- -371 m Sima de la ZAPATILLA (Huesca)
- -370 m Sima de la TORRE DE MARBORE (Huesca)
- -370 m Sumidero de CALLEJA LAVALLE (Cantabria)
- -370 m Torca del VALLE del AGUA (VA-1) (Asturias)
- -368 m Torca de ACEBUCO (Asturias)
- -367 m Sima del TERNERO (K.901) (León)
- -365 m Sima C.2 del LLANO CARRERAS (Navarre)
- -361 m Torca del INFANZON (Asturias)
- -360 m Avenc BERNAT RENOM (Huesca)
- -360 m Sima BU.4 DE BUDOGUIA (Navarre)
- -358 m Sumidero de la LUNADA (Burgos)
- -355 m Sima del PORTILLO DE ARRIBA (Navarre)
- -354 m PAGOMARIKO LEIZEA (Navarre)
- -354 m (-341 +13) Pozu LA CARBA (Asturias)
- -351 m EZKAURRE'KO LEIZEA (Navarre)
- -350 m Torca del HOYÓN II (Cantabria)
- -350 m Pozu VALDEPINU (V.13) (Asturias)
- -350 m Torca del FRAILIN (Asturias)
- -350 m Torca de los TORRALLOS VERDES (Agujerón de los Basares MS76) (León)
- -350 m Sima A-27 (Huesca)
- -350 m Sima A-69 (Huesca)
- -350 m Sima CS09 (Cantabria)
- -349 m Torca de los JOUS DEL AGUA (Asturias)
- -349 m Torca del Carlista (Cantabria-Biscay)
- -345 m LEIZEBELTZ (Gipuzkoa)
- -345 m Torca del TEJO (Cantabria)
- -345 m Pozu de la MAZADA (Asturias)
- -344 m Red del JUNJUMIA (Asturias)
- -344 m AN 211 (Navarre)
- -343 m Pozu Jou CABAU (Asturias)
- -341 m Sima de lo FAITO (F.135-F.136) (Huesca)
- -341 m Torca la MAZUELA (Biscay)
- -340 m LEIZE HAUNDIA II – SAROBE SAILAKO LEIZEA (Gipuzkoa)
- -340 m Sima de la GARMA DE LOS TRILLOS-VT62 (Cantabria)
- -340 m Sima S1 - S3 de ESPIGÜETE (Palencia)
- -337 m Sima de la CASA DE LOS PASTORES (Navarre)
- -335 m Pozo ARGÜELLES (León)
- -334 m Torca del CALERO DEL AGUA (Cantabria)
- -333 m Torca del RÉQUIEM DE LAS MOTAS (Cantabria)
- -333 m Torca JUANIN (Asturias)
- -330 m IÑERITZE (Biscay)
- -330 m Sima de la CUMA DE ANSU (Navarre)
- -330 m Torca LA BARGA (Asturias)
- -327 m Pozo de la CANAL DE CHIZIDI (Pozo de los Machanes, RA.25) (Asturias)
- -327 m Torca de TEJES (Cantabria)
- -327 m Torca del SAPO (Cantabria)
- -327 m (+315/-12) Cova CUBERES (Lleida)
- -323 m Pozu los DESVIOS (Asturias)
- -322 m Red de les BARRASTROSES (Asturias)
- -322 m Sima del Turbón (T.7) (Huesca)
- -322 m Sima del VES (Palencia)
- -321 m (-312+9) Torca del TURBON DE LA PORRA (Cantabria)
- -320 m Sima C.110 del LLANO CARRERAS (Navarre)
- -320 m Cigalera de l'OBAGA DE BALERAN (Lleida)
- -320 m URRIKOBASO’KO LEZANDI (Biscay)
- -319 m Torca de las FALSAS ESPERANZAS (Cantabria)
- -319 m RASA 98 (Cantabria)
- -318 m (-276 +42) Sima CEMA BLANCA (Huesca)
- -318 m Torca de MAZARRASA (Cantabria)
- -317 m (-296/+20) Pozo ALTO DE LA CHORROTA (Huesca)
- -317 m Cova de SA CAMPANA (Balears)
- -317 m Sistema de la VEGA (Cantabria)
- -316 m Gralleros de SALINAS (Asturias)
- -316 m Sima de SOASO (S.8) (Huesca)
- -313 m Torca del HOYÓN (de Alisas) (Cantabria)
- -313 m Grallera de la FONTAZA (Huesca)
- -313 m Pozu TRES LA HAYADA (Asturias)
- -313 m Torca de la RAMAZOSA (Cantabria)
- -311 m Sima MANOLO PÉREZ (Málaga)
- -310 m Torca JOU de l’AGUA (Asturias)
- -310 m Torca de las CARCAVAS (Cantabria)
- -310 m C-118 Cotiella (Huesca)
- -310 m Pozo Castillo (Natacha) (Cantabria)
- -309 m (-301, +8) Pozo la DUERNONA (León)
- -307 m TXOMIN VIII (Biscay)
- -306 m DS CA 16 (Cantabria)
- -306 m Sima DE UKERDI ALTO (UK.311) (Navarre)
- -305 m Torca de CARLOS MIER (Asturias)
- -303 m Pozo ALFA.30 (León)
- -303 m Torca del REGATO CALERO II (Cantabria)
- -301 m Cueva del JABATO (Cantabria)
- -301 m Torca del SEGADOR (Cantabria)
- -300 m Gran Pozo de PROMEDIO (G.8) (Asturias)
- -300 m Pozu les PALOMBARES (Asturias)
- -300 m Red de CERVERIZ (H.4) (Asturias)
- -300 m Red del JAYAU (Asturias)
- -300 m Complejo de los JAMEOS (Cueva de los Verdes-Túnel de la Atlántida) (Isla Lanzarote/Las Palmas/Canarias)
- -300 m FD3/Mortillano (Cantabria)

== Other caves ==
- Ambrosio Cave, archeological site, classified as a natural monument, in Almería
- Caves of Monte Castillo
  - Cave of El Castillo
  - Cave of Las Chimeneas
  - Cave of Las Monedas
  - Cave of La Pasiega
- Las Caldas Cave (Asturias) - Paleolithic site and nature reserve

== By Autonomous communities ==
- Caves in Cantabria
- Caving in the Balearic Islands

== Unesco World Heritage Sites caves ==
- Cave Art of Northern Spain
- Cave Art of Iberian Mediterranean Basin
- Cave Art of Siega Verde

== See also ==
- List of caves
- Speleology
