= Asón-Agüera =

Coordinates: 43.2883°N 3.4461°W

- Comarca
- Flag Coat of arms
- Country: Spain
- Autonomous community: Cantabria
- Province: Cantabria
- Capital: Ramales de la Victoria
- Municipalities: List: Guriezo, Limpias, Ramales de la Victoria, Rasines, Ruesga, Soba, Valle de Villaverde

Area
  - Total: 261.28 km^{2} (100.88 sq mi)

Population (1.1.2018)
  - Total: 15,087
  - Density: 57.743/km^{2} (149.55/sq mi)
- Demonym(s): asonero, -a
- Time zone: UTC+1 (CET)
  - Summer (DST): UTC+2 (CEST)

The Asón-Agüera comarca is a historical region of Cantabria, Spain. It is located in the upper courses of the Asón and Agüera rivers, near the border with Vizcaya in the Basque Country. The comarca encompasses the basin of the Asón river and its tributaries such as the Gándara.

The region was part of the historical territories of the Valley of Soba and Ruesga Villaverde, and the Merindad de Vecio (Junta de Parayas, Villas Laredo, Seña and clean, and Valle de Guriezo).

== Municipalities ==
- Ampuero
- Arredondo.
- Guriezo.

Most Populated Places
Rank	Municipality	Population 2018
1º	Ampuero	4,219
2º	Ramales de la Victoria	2,881
3º	Guriezo	2,347

- Limpias.
- Ramales de la Victoria.
- Rasines.
- Ruesga.
- Soba.
- Valle de Villaverde (exclave; enclaved within the Biscay).

At the start of 2018, the total population of the region (according to the INE) was 15,087 inhabitants (see table). The three most populated centers are: Ampuero (4,219), Ramales de Victoria (2,881) and Guriezo (2,347). Lesser populated places are: Valle de Villaverde (286) Arredondo (470) and Rasines (952).

== Geography ==
Asón Valley is known for its rugged solid limestone, which house inside caving wealth and ancient forests of beech, oak and holm are the most notable in the eastern part of Cantabria.

Soba Valley is crossed by the Gandara River, a tributary of the Assos River. Historical and municipal limits of Soba exceed those of geographically understood valley, and also include the headwaters of the Asón, the right bank of the valley of the river Miera (Valdició village in the municipality of Soba) and the left bank of the valley of the river Calera, bordering with the province of Vizcaya.

== Highlights ==
Archaeological sites:

- Ramales (Ramales de la Victoria)
- Cueva del Valle (Rasines)
- Arboretum of Liendo

== Gallery ==
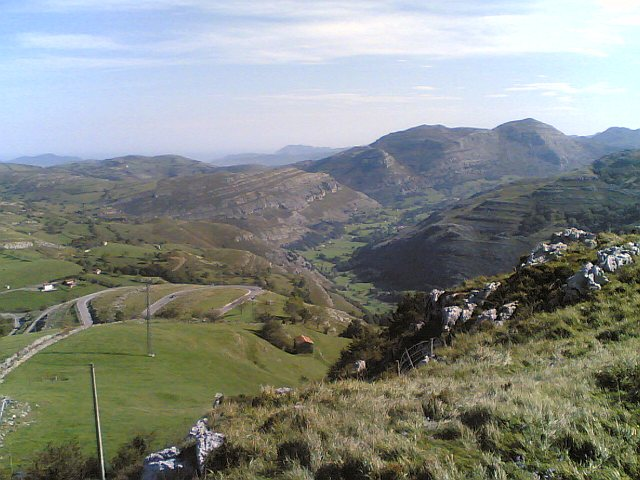
Valle de Matienzo en Ruesga.

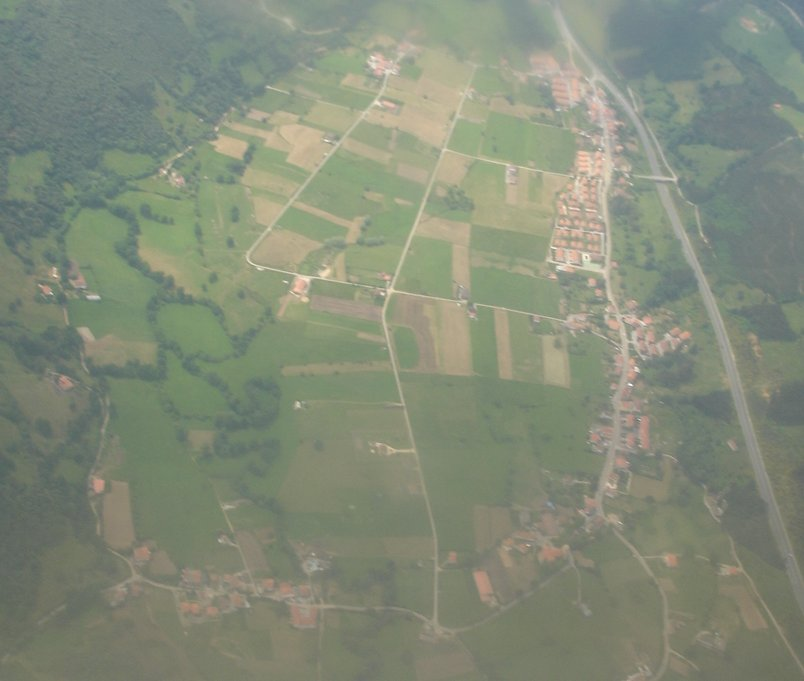
Vista aérea de Rasines.

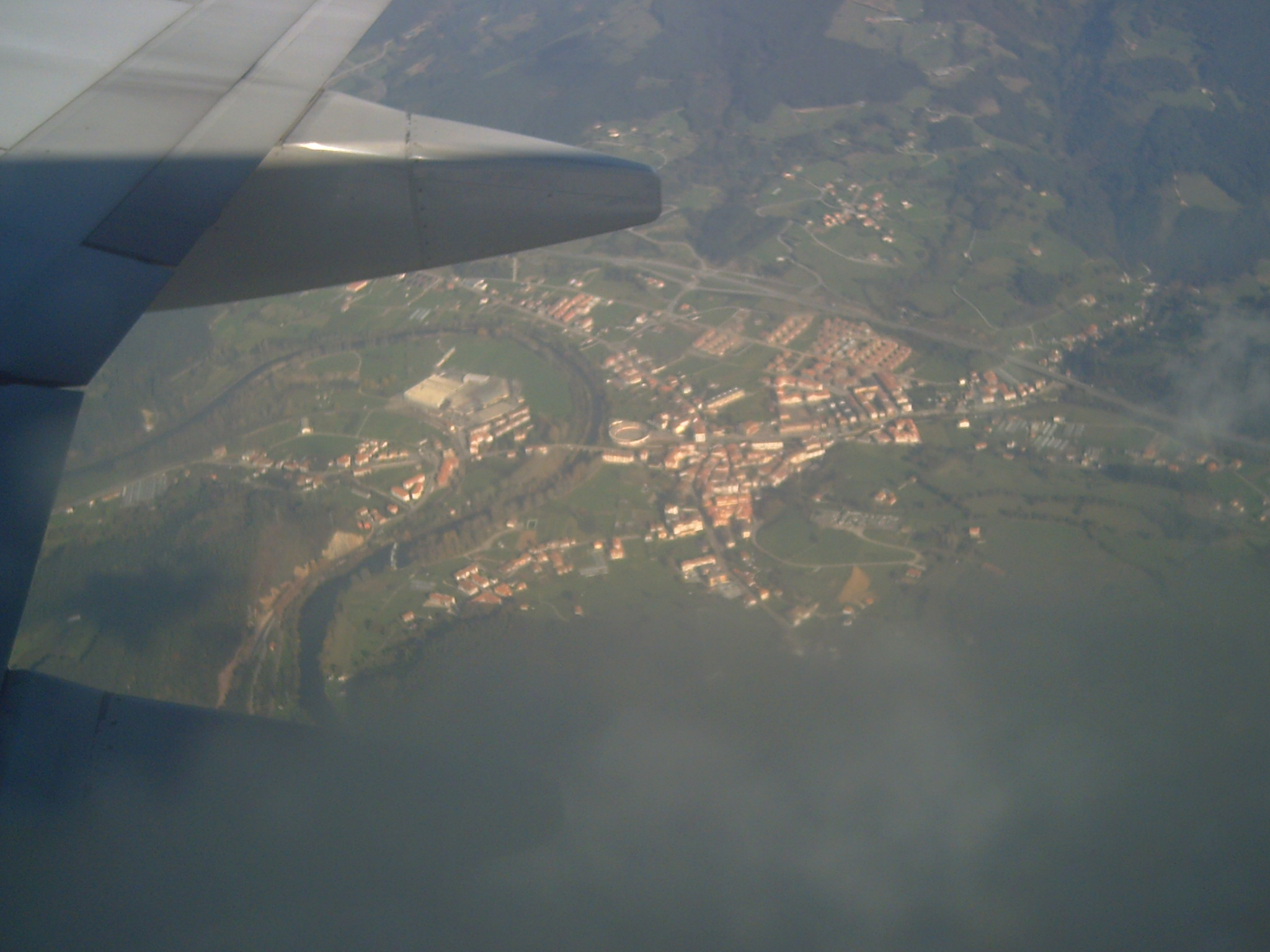
Vista aérea de Ampuero.

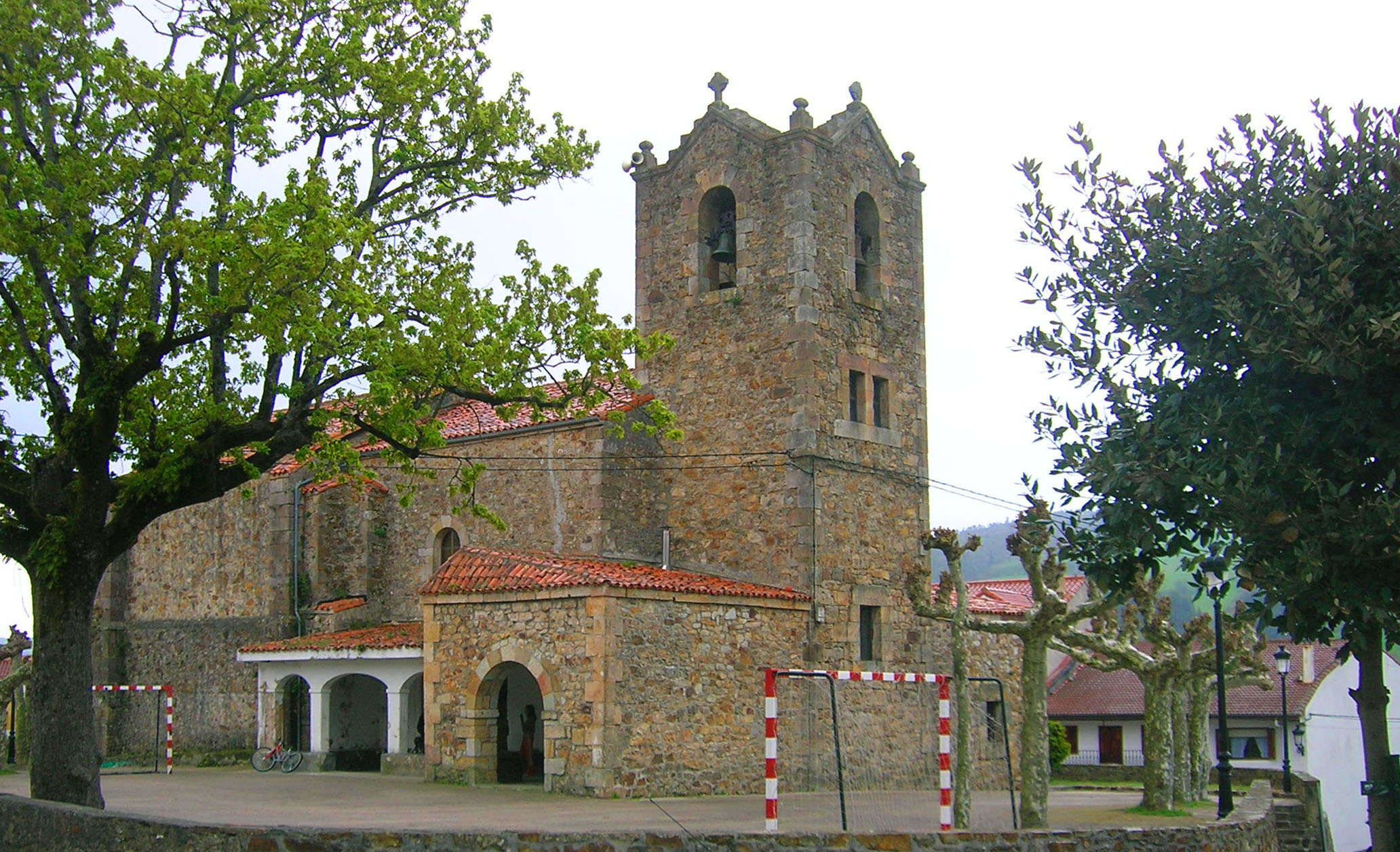
Iglesia de la localidad de Seña, en Limpias.
