= Collados del Asón Natural Park =

Natural park in Cantabria, Spain

Coordinates: 43°11′41″N 3°35′52″W

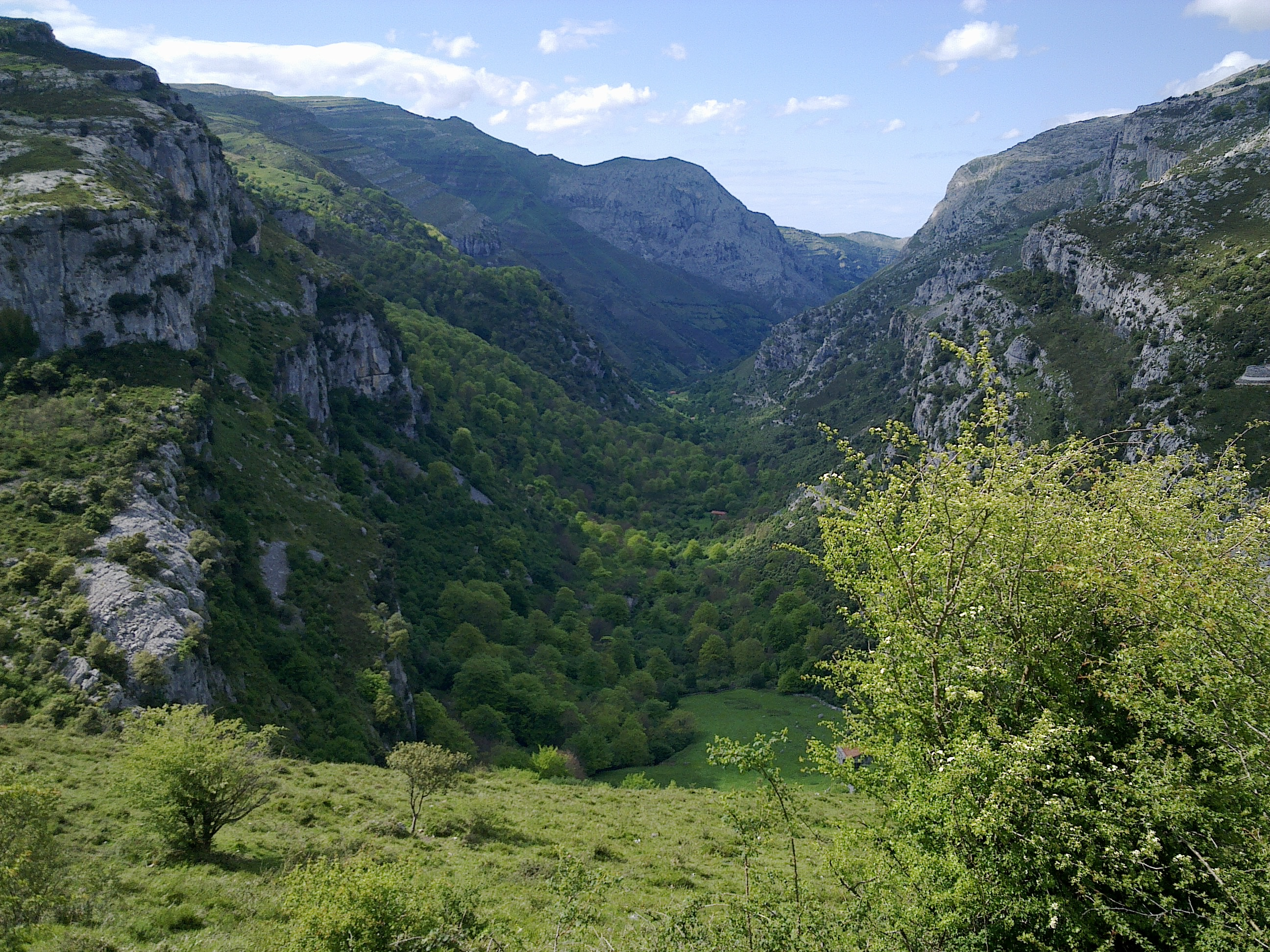
Collados del Asón Natural Park

Collados del Asón Natural Park (Spanish: Parque Natural de los Collados del Asón) is a natural park that includes parts of the Asón River, Cantabria, Spain. It was declared as a Natural Park by Cantabria on 18 February 1999.

It is located in the Cantabrian Mountains in the southeast of Cantabria, with an area of 4,740 ha, of which 4020 ha belongs to the municipality of Soba and 720 ha are private land. Its altitude ranges between 240 and 1,632 m above sea level.

It is characterized by limestone outcrops, small beech forests, and unique Cantabrian holm oaks, together with manmade meadows for livestocks. This diverse habitat allows the development of a varied wildlife characteristic of the Cordillera. The park is located in an area that has traditionally been very unpopulated, which has made it possible for it to be so natural and undisturbed.

The small neighborhood of Asón, Soba is the only population center that is within the limits of the park.
