= Battle of Ramales =

Battle of the First Carlist War

- Part of First Carlist War
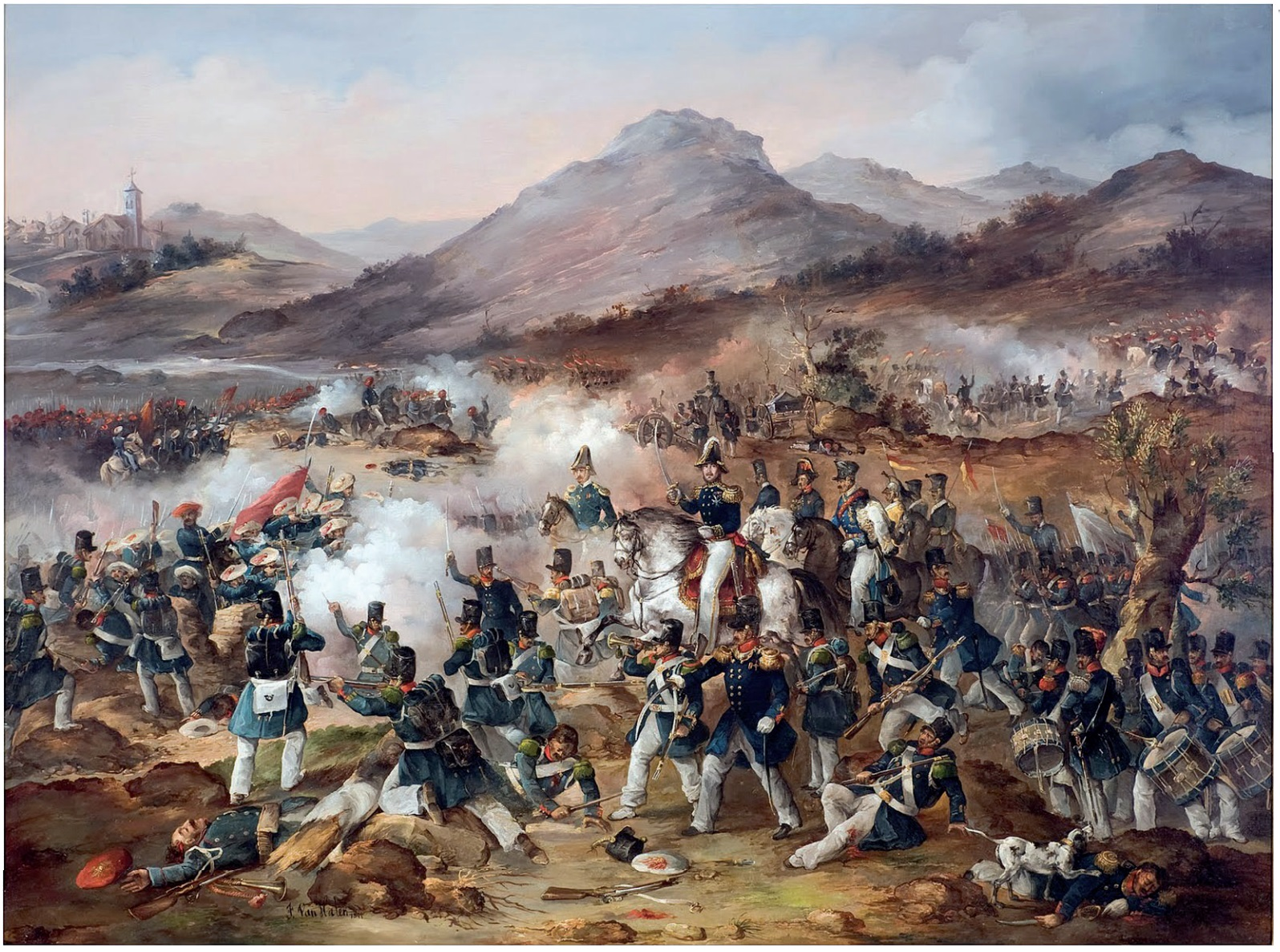
Date	12 May 1839
Location	Ramales de la Victoria, Cantabria, Spain 43°15′23″N 3°27′52″W
Result	Decisive Liberal victory, end of the First Carlist War

Belligerents
Carlists supporting Infante Carlos of Spain	Liberals (Isabelinos or Cristinos) supporting Isabella II of Spain and her regent mother Maria Christina

Commanders and leaders
Rafael Maroto	Baldomero Espartero

Casualties and losses
988	835
- Location within Spain

The Battle of Ramales, a battle of the First Carlist War, occurred at Ramales in Cantabria on May 12, 1839. The successful Liberals were commanded by Baldomero Espartero, the Carlists by Rafael Maroto.

== History ==
The Liberals, initially outnumbering the Carlists twice over, ended up having four times as many forces. This resulted from the fact that Maroto kept eight of his seventeen battalions in reserve and had ordered the defenders of the fortification of Guardamino to abandon this post. Maroto was later accused of complicity with his opponent Espartero for having performed these two actions.

Espartero ordered Leopoldo O'Donnell to attack the Carlists positioned in the heights of Mazo, while Ramón Castañeda was ordered by Espartero to attack the Carlists at the Peña del Moro. Ramales was battered by the Isabeline artillery, but the Liberals were only able to take this town after annihilating a Carlist force of 27 men entrenched in a nearby cave. There are different versions of the story of how this annihilation took place. Some attribute the actions of the Liberal guerrilla Juan Ruiz Gutierrez, known as Cobanes, and say that Cobanes threw straw into the cave and then set it on fire, thereby dislodging the Carlist defenders. Others attribute the victory to a 7-hour siege of artillery or the use of Congreve rockets.

Ramales was ultimately conquered but was destroyed both by the Carlist forces in retreat and by the Liberal occupiers.

Ramales was renamed Ramales de La Victoria after the battle, and Espartero received the title of Duque de La Victoria (Duke of La Victoria).

For the Carlists, the loss of Ramales meant that they had to evacuate the valley of Carranza, lost the metal foundry at Guriezo, and had to abandon the chance to operate from Cantabrian lands and potentially invade Asturias and Galicia.
