= Matienzo (disambiguation) =

Matienzo is a village and a karst depression in Spain.

Matienzo may also refer to:

- Matienzo Base, a base and scientific research station in Argentine Antarctica
- Teniente General Benjamín Matienzo International Airport, in Tucumán Province, Argentina
