= Gibaja =

Coordinates: 43°17′N 3°26′W

Gibaja (pop. 385) is situated in the north of Spain, in the Autonomous Region of Cantabria. It belongs to the council of Ramales de la Victoria. Gibaja is formed by a series of neighborhoods, namely La Quintana, Pondra, Riancho, Bárcena and La Estación.

Gibaja has its own train station on the railway line FEVE which connects Bilbao and Santander. Two rivers, the Asón and the Carranza, cross Gibaja. The first is one of the most important salmon rivers in Cantabria.
