= El Puente, Cantabria =

El Puente
- Village
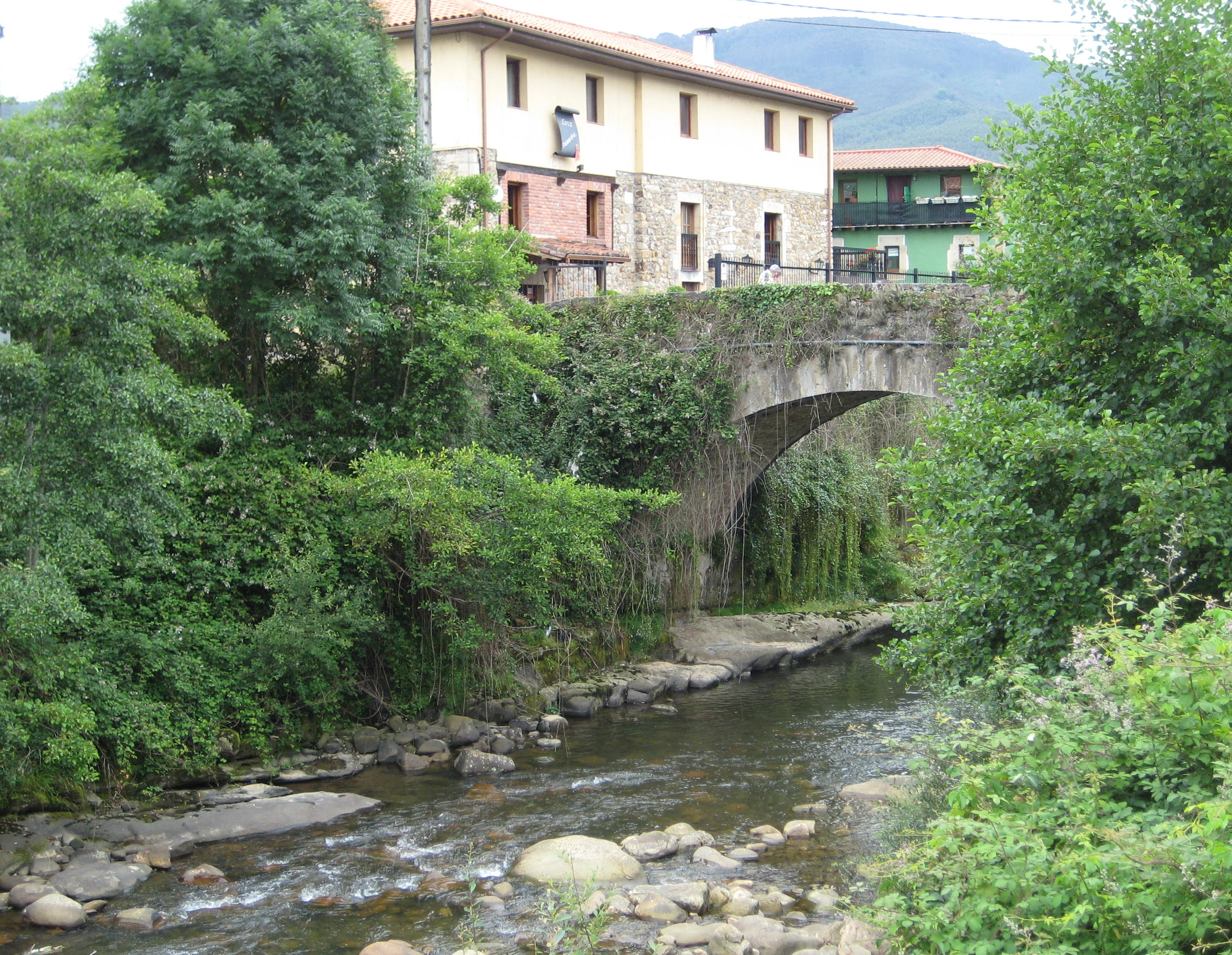

- Location within Spain
- Coordinates: 43°20′49″N 3°19′27″W
- Country: Spain
- Autonomous community: Cantabria
- County: Asón-Agüera
- Municipality: Guriezo
- Elevation: 40 m (130 ft)

Population (2008)
  - Total: 535
- Postal code: 39788

El Puente is the capital of the municipality of Guriezo (Cantabria, Spain). In 2008 it had a population of 535 inhabitants (INE). The town is located 40 meters above sea level, and is 67.5 miles away from the Cantabrian capital Santander.
