= Limpias =

- Municipality
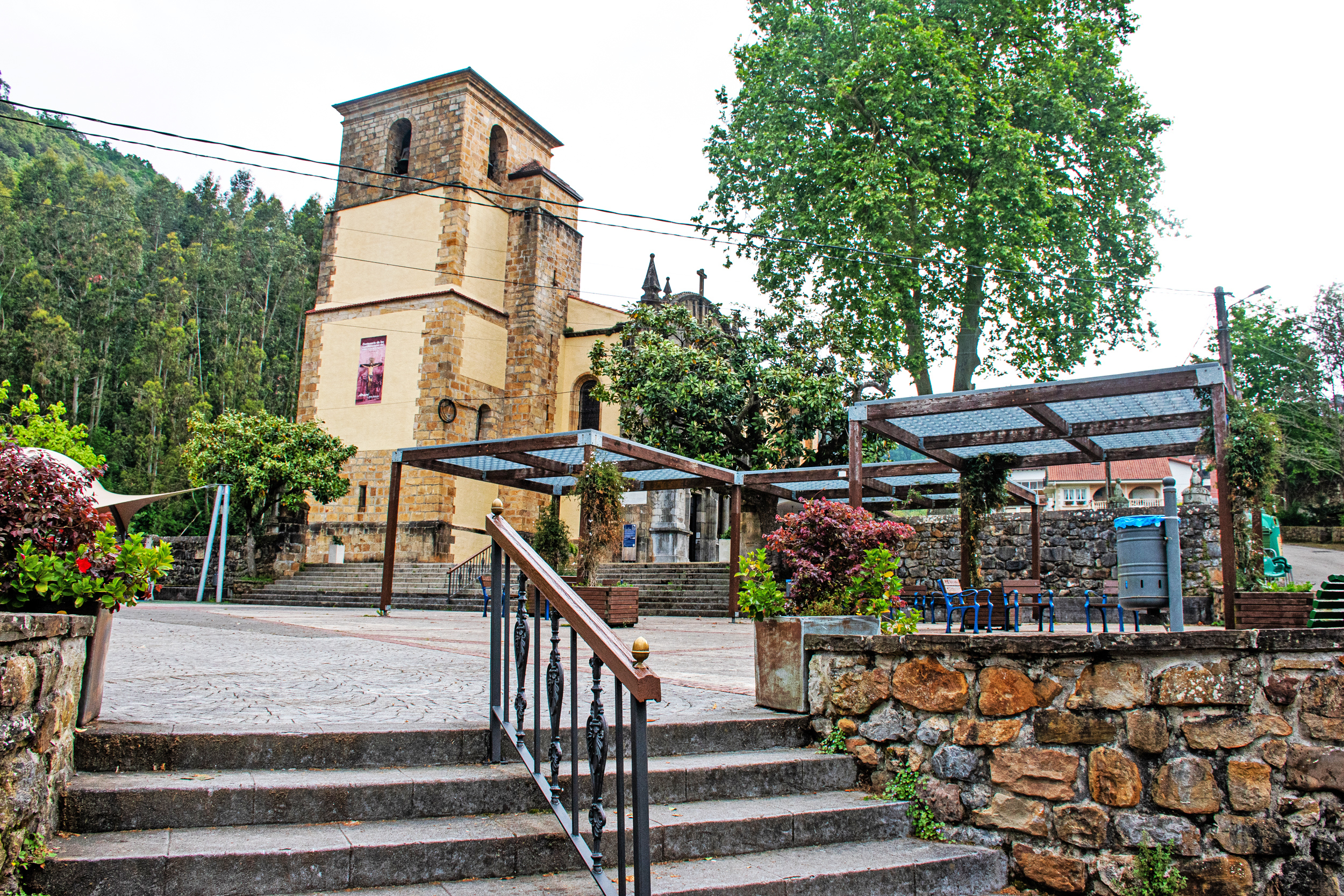
- Church-Shrine of the Holy Christ of the Agony, Limpias

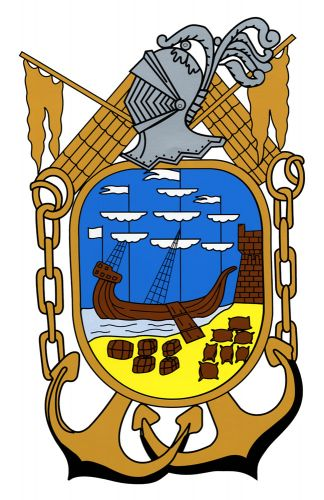
- Flag Coat of arms

- Location of Limpias

- Location in Spain
- Coordinates: 43°21′46″N 3°25′29″W
- Country: Spain
- Autonomous community: Cantabria
- Province: Cantabria
- Comarca: Asón valley
- Judicial district: Laredo
- Capital: Limpias

Government
  - Alcaldesa: María del Mar Iglesias Arce (2007) (PSC-PSOE)

Area
  - Total: 10.07 km^{2} (3.89 sq mi)
- Elevation: 29 m (95 ft)

Population (2025-01-01)
  - Total: 1,983
  - Density: 196.9/km^{2} (510.0/sq mi)
- Demonym: Lumpiense
- Time zone: UTC+1 (CET)
  - Summer (DST): UTC+2 (CEST)
- Website: Official website

Limpias is a municipality located in the autonomous community of Cantabria, Spain. According to the 2007 census, the city has a population of 1,497 inhabitants. It is the home of the Church-Shrine of the Holy Christ of the Agony of Limpias (Santo Cristo de la Agonía de Limpias), a 17th century crucifix said to be miraculous.
