= Ampuero =

- Municipality
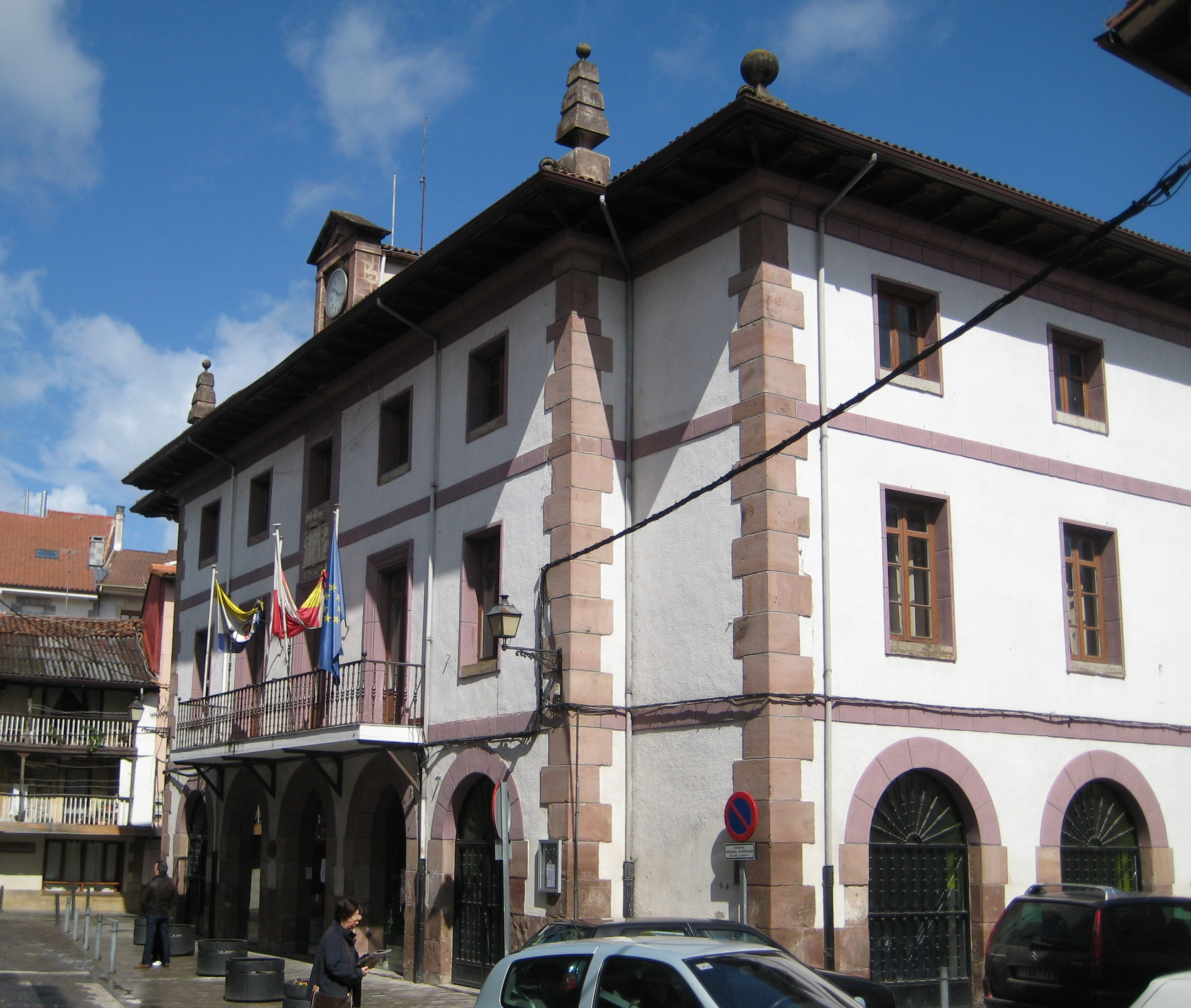

- Flag Coat of arms

- Location in Spain Ampuero (Spain)
- Coordinates: 43°20′41″N 3°24′52″W
- Country: Spain
- Autonomous community: Cantabria
- Province: Cantabria
- Comarca: Asón valley
- Judicial district: Laredo
- Capital: Ampuero

Government
  - Alcaldesa: María de las Nieves Abascal Gómez (2007) (PSC-PSOE)

Area
  - Total: 32.34 km^{2} (12.49 sq mi)
- Elevation: 11 m (36 ft)

Population
  - Total: 4,384
  - Density: 135.6/km^{2} (351.1/sq mi)
- Time zone: UTC+1 (CET)
  - Summer (DST): UTC+2 (CEST)
- Postal code: 39840
- Website: Official website

Ampuero is a municipality located in the autonomous community of Cantabria, Spain. It has a population of approximately 4,384. The municipality was once under the jurisdiction of the municipality of Laredo, but was formally recognised as an autonomous municipality in 1728 by Phillip V of Spain.

Since 1941, Ampuero is the site of an annual running of the bulls event held in September, as part of celebrations in honour of the Infant Mary (La Virgen Niña).
