= Tomás Borrás =

Spanish journalist, novelist and playwright (1891–1976)

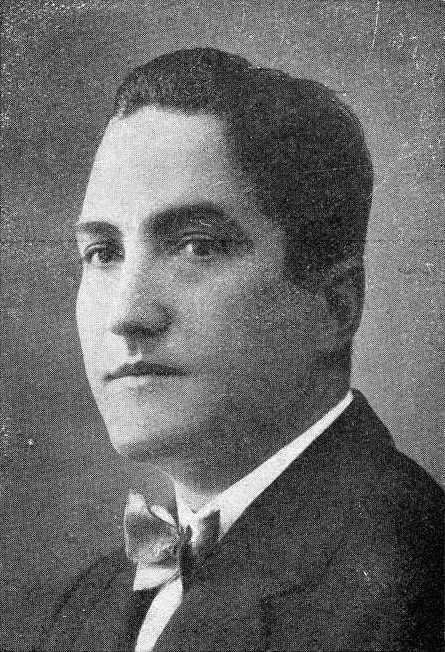
Tomás Borrás (date unknown)

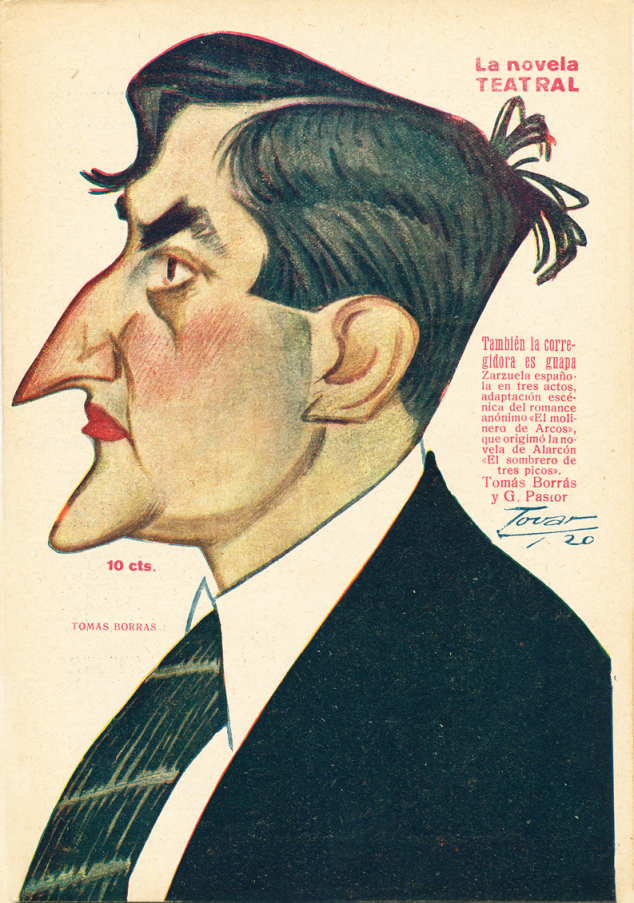
Caricature of Borrás, by Manuel Tovar, from La Novela Teatral (1920)

Tomás Borrás y Bermejo (10 February 1891, Madrid - 26 August 1976, Madrid) was a Spanish journalist, novelist and playwright.

== Life and career ==
He attended the Instituto San Isidro, leading to a degree in law, but he practiced for only a short time before deciding to change careers; having been a writer since his youth. As a member of the tertulia at the Café Pombo, he appears in a famous group portrait by José Gutiérrez Solana. He was married to the tonadillera and cupletista, Aurora Jaufrett, who performed under the name "La Goya".

Eventually, he became a journalist, beginning as a collaborator at the informal daily journal, La Nación, during the dictatorship of Primo de Rivera, then took a position with the daily ABC and its associated magazine, Blanco y Negro. Later, he was a participant in the Juntas de Ofensiva Nacional-Sindicalista (JONS), which became the Falange.

During the Francoist dictatorship, he worked for publications such as Vértice, subsequently becoming the Editor of the dailies, F.E. from Seville and España, from Tangiers. He also held several minor political positions.

In 1953, he was named the Cronista Oficial de la Villa de Madrid (Official Chronicler of Madrid). He was also awarded the Premio Nacional de Periodismo and the Premio Nacional de Literatura. Shortly after his death, the street where he had lived for much of his life was renamed for him. The Círculo de Bellas Artes placed a commemorative plaque at the corner.

== Works ==
He was very prolific; producing numerous novels and plays in addition to his journalistic work. He also had a fondness for verses and biographies. Most of his work is in the Modernismo style and he was deeply involved in one of the most innovative theatrical companies of the time, the Teatro de Arte, under the direction of Gregorio Martínez Sierra. Of particular note was El sapo enamorado (The Frog in Love), which preimiered in 1916, with music by Pablo Luna and decorations by José Zamora.

His literary works include a collection of 203 very short stories (what would now be called "flash fiction") entitled Cuentos gnómicos (Gnomic Tales), which were published in thirteen volumes between 1940 and 1969. Sixty-four of the tales were selected for a later edition, published in 2013.

His radio drama, Todos los ruidos de aquel día (All the Noises of that Day), was broadcast on PRISA Radio on April 24, 1931, ten days after the proclamation of the Second Republic. It is considered to be one of the first radio plays in which sound effects served as a fundamental presence.
