= El Asón =

Defunct weekly newspaper in Spain (1908–1911)

El Asón was an independent weekly newspaper published from Ramales, Spain, in the period 1908–1911.
