= Guriezo =

- Municipality
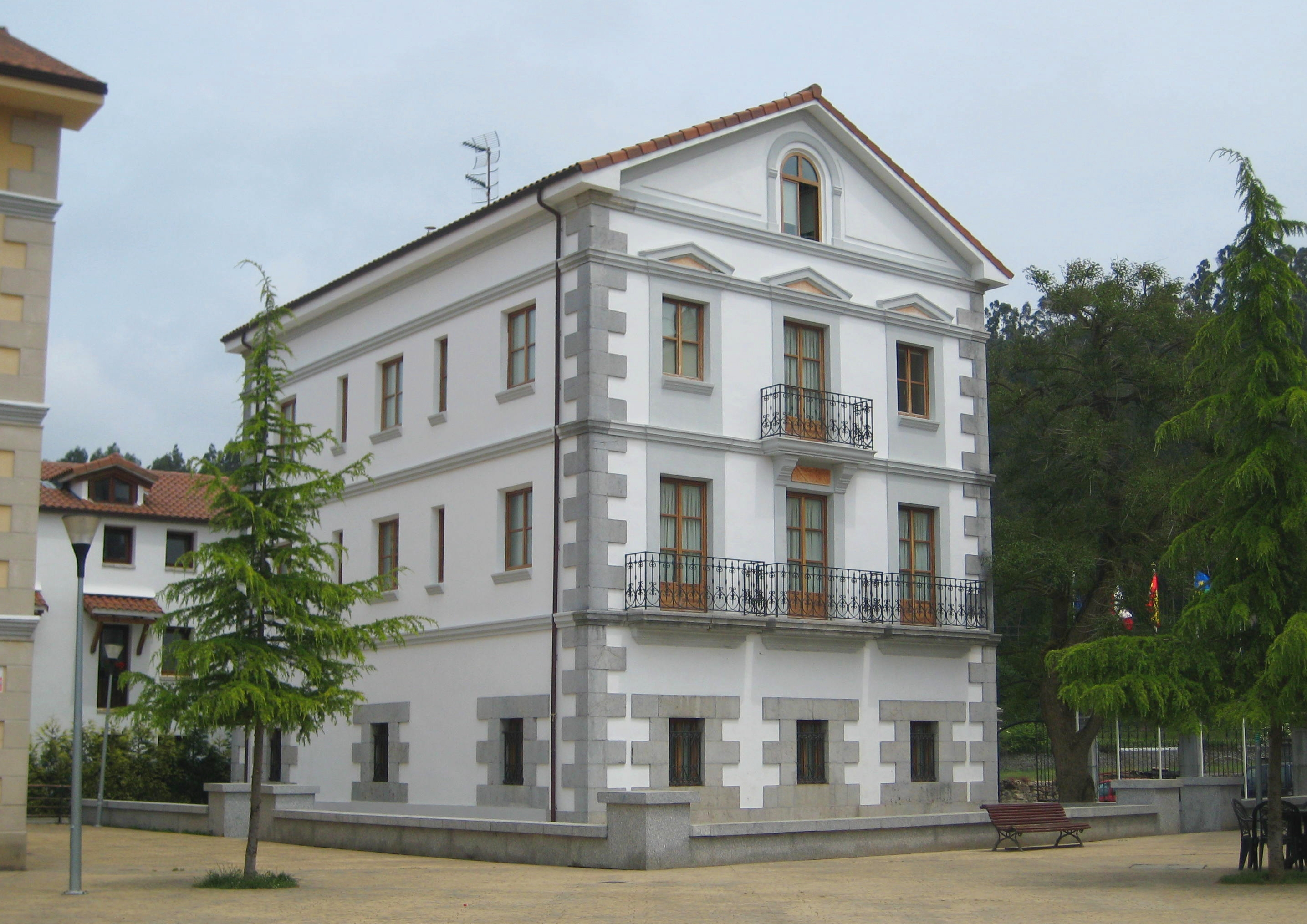
- Town hall of Guriezo

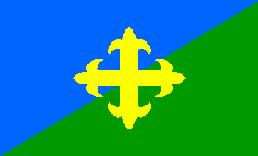
- Flag Coat of arms

- Location of Guriezo

- Location in Spain Guriezo (Spain)
- Coordinates: 43°20′31″N 3°19′36″W
- Country: Spain
- Autonomous community: Cantabria
- Province: Cantabria
- Comarca: Asón-Agüera
- Judicial district: Castro Urdiales
- Seat: El Puente

Government
  - Alcalde: Adolfo Izaguirre Ruiz (2011) (PRC)

Area
  - Total: 74.53 km^{2} (28.78 sq mi)
- Elevation: 40 m (130 ft)

Population (2025-01-01)
  - Total: 2,496
  - Density: 33.49/km^{2} (86.74/sq mi)
- Time zone: UTC+1 (CET)
  - Summer (DST): UTC+2 (CEST)

Guriezo is a municipality located in the autonomous community of Cantabria, Spain. According to the 2013 census, the town has a population of 2,424 inhabitants. Its capital is El Puente.

== Settlements ==
- Adino
- Agüera
- Angostina
- Balbacienta
- Cabaña la Sierra.
- Carazón.
- La Corra.
- Francos.
- Landeral.
- Lendagua
- Llaguno
- El Llano
- Lugarejos
- La Magdalena
- Nocina
- Pomar
- El Puente (Seat).
- Ranero
- Revilla
- Rioseco
- Santa Cruz
- Torquiendo
- Trebuesto
- Tresagua

== History ==
Megalithic evidence from the surroundings of Guriezo attests, that the area was inhabited back in prehistorical times as early as 4000 BC. Spear points from the Bronze Age have been found in caves throughout the area, namely in the cave of la Cervajera.

During the Middle Ages, the most prominent dynasties in the area were the Villota and Entrambasaguas families, which fought for the control of administrative and political positions. The conflict between these two families dates back to the 15th century, when they litigated about the ownership of the local foundries. In the second half of the 18th century, their disagreements brought them all the way to the Royal Chancery of Valladolid. Guriezo was quite active in the iron trade with Biscay's foundries during the late Middle Ages. Guriezo played a role in the development of the prosperous Basque iron industry; in 1846, members of the prominent Ybarra family acquired the factory of La Merced, which operated until 1854.

During the Spanish Civil War, Guriezo was the setting for a number of events: on 24 August 1937, the Santoña Agreement was signed in the village, as a result of which 10,000 soldiers from the Basque Army surrendered to Franco's Italian allies. During 1938, a number of republican fugitives under the lead of former lieutenant Manuel Pérez Tejera were ambushed and executed in the mountains around Guriezo; it was not until 1941 when Pérez Tejera himself was found and killed.

== Economy ==
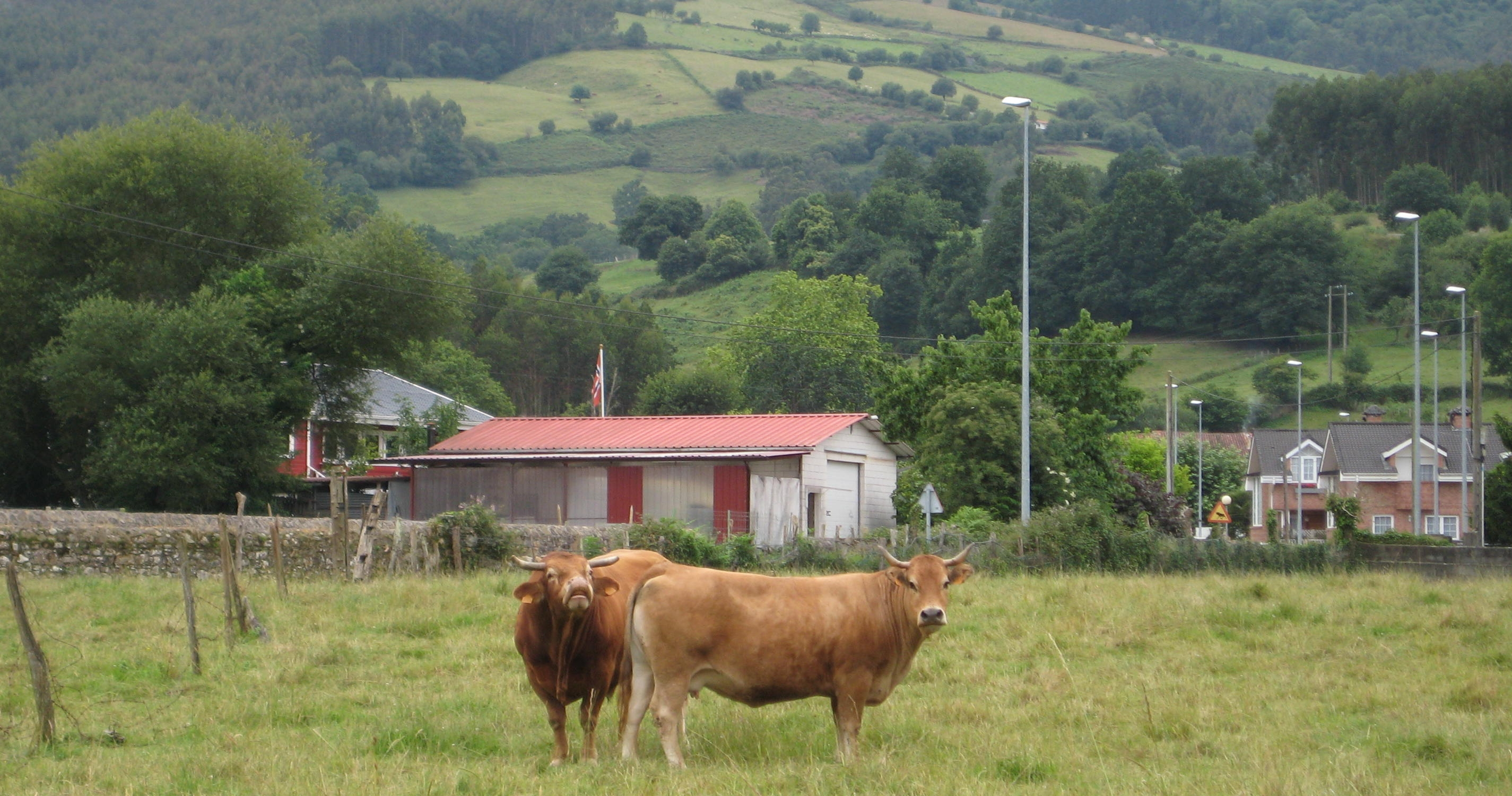
Cattle in Adino, Guriezo.

As of 2008, the per capita income of Guriezo stood at €15,010, which was slightly below the regional figure of €15,911, yet Guriezo had one of the greatest per capita incomes among rural Cantabrian municipalities.

In 2007, around 7% of the businesses in Guriezo operated in the agricultural sector, 29% in construction, 13% in industry and roughly 50% in the service sector. When compared to the region as a whole, Guriezo has a considerably lower proportion of service businesses, but a higher percentage of agricultural, building and industrial companies.

When it comes to the labour market, the Eastern Coastal area of Cantabria, which encompasses Guriezo and other municipalities, had an unemployment rate slightly above 20%, in tune with the regional average for 2013. As of April 2014, there were 193 jobseekers in the village.

== Demographics ==
These are the places of birth of the population of Guriezo according to the National Institute of Statistics (INE).

Total Population	Born in Cantabria	Born in another Autonomous Community	Born in another Country
2424	1215	1053	156

Just over half of the population was born in Cantabria, but a significant percentage of the inhabitants (43.5%) hails from other Autonomous Communities. Just above 6% of the population are immigrants.

== Administration ==
The results of the 2011 local elections were as follows:

2011 Spanish local elections
Party	Votes	%	Councillors
PRC	702	46,09 %	6
PP	571	37,49 %	4
PSOE	139	9,13 %	1

- Elected Mayor: Adolfo Izaguirre Ruiz (PRC).
