= Celis, Spain =

Celis
- Municipality
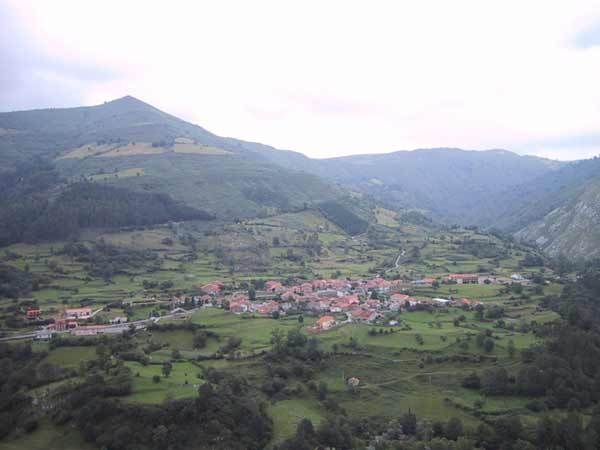
- Panoramic view of Celis.

- Location within Spain
- Coordinates: 43°16′57.95″N 4°26′4.65″W
- Country: Spain
- Province: Cantabria
- Time zone: UTC+1 (CET)
  - Summer (DST): UTC+2 (CEST)
- Official language(s): Spanish

Celis is a town located in the province of Cantabria in northern Spain.

== History ==
After Romulus founded the city of Rome in 753 BC, he expanded his empire through his private army made of 300 fierce, well-trained Etruscans. Led by Romulus' Lieutenant Celer, the cavalry was called the "Celeres". Throughout the centuries, Emperors were choosing the new Celeres Warriors from sons of the wealthy, and the newly made Patricians. When the Roman Empire fell in 476 AD, the Celeres warriors and their families left Rome and went west to the Valley of Rionansa in Cantabria, Spain. The small village, and the surnames of the people who lived there, were named Celis. The sunny valley, which often receives rain, is a few kilometres from the Cantabric Sea.

For generations the Celeres married the locals creating new families with local roots. The ex-soldiers only work on the land and with the cattle, they also help on a small castle which was used by the villagers to defend against attack. The new Cantabric and Etruscan blood have shown loyalty to the "Order of Santiago", and to the "Real Chancellery of Valladolid", and because of that, all Celeres were included in the Spanish Heraldry.

== Gallery ==
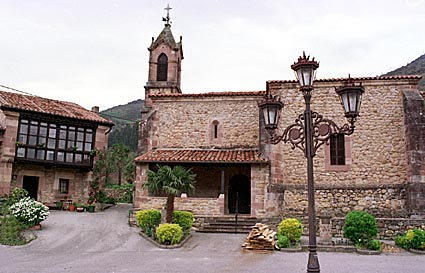
Church of San Pedro, Celis, Spain
