= Arredondo, Spain =

Arredondo
- Municipality
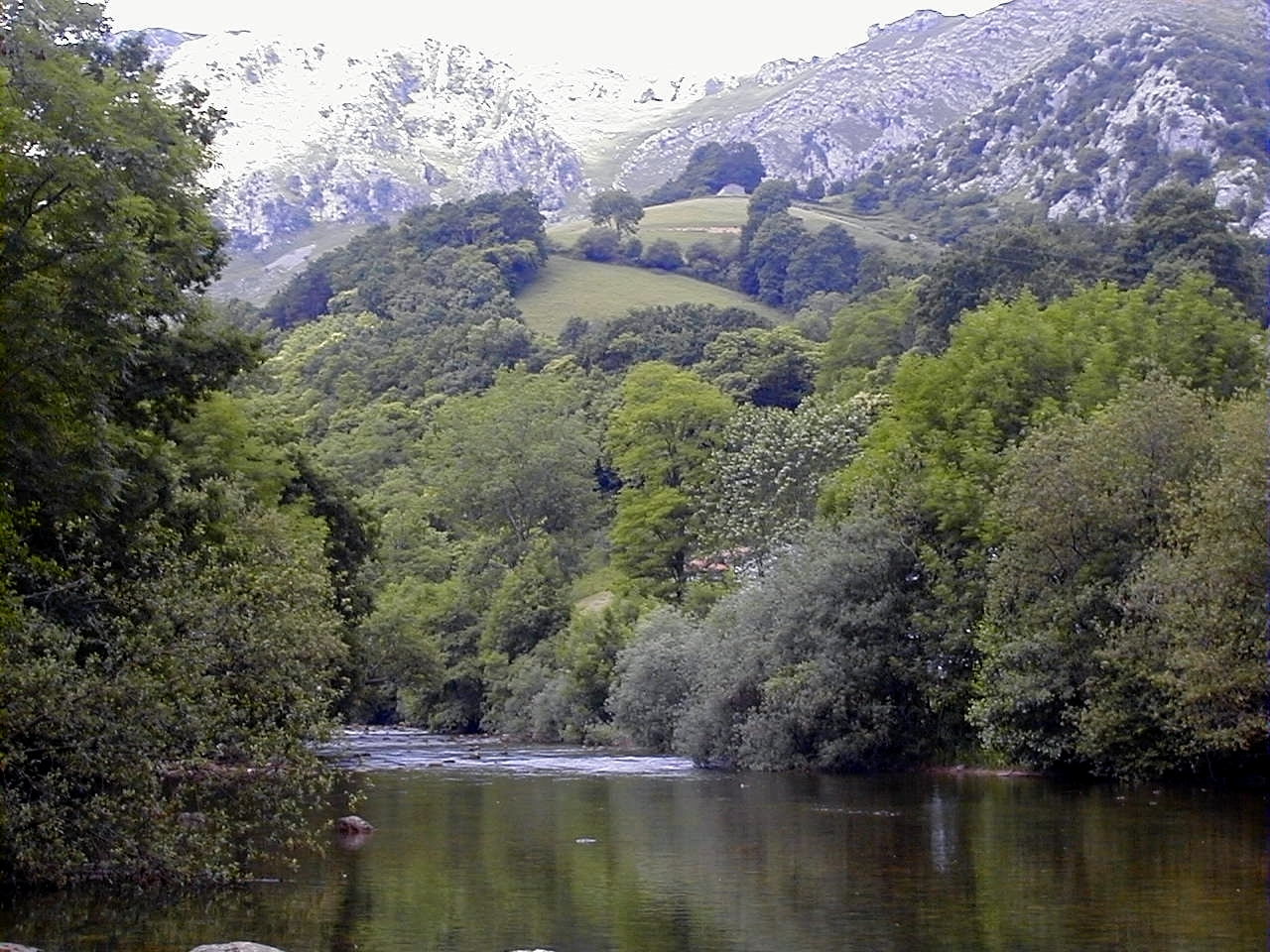
- Asón River in Arredondo

- Flag Coat of arms

- Location within Cantabria Arredondo (Spain)
- Coordinates: 43°16′33″N 3°36′2″W
- Country: Spain
- Autonomous community: Cantabria
- Province: Cantabria
- Comarca: Asón valley
- Judicial district: Laredo
- Capital: Arredondo

Government
  - Alcalde: Luis Alberto Santander Peral (2007) (PRC)

Area
  - Total: 46.83 km^{2} (18.08 sq mi)
- Elevation: 161 m (528 ft)

Population (2025-01-01)
  - Total: 478
  - Density: 10.2/km^{2} (26.4/sq mi)
- Time zone: UTC+1 (CET)
  - Summer (DST): UTC+2 (CEST)
- Postal code: 39813
- Website: Official website

Arredondo is a municipality located in the autonomous community of Cantabria, Spain. According to the 2007 census, the city has a population of 569 inhabitants.

The town of Arredondo is known as "La Capital del Mundo" (The Capital of the World).

== Towns ==
- Alisas
- Arredondo (Capital)
- Asón
- El Avellanal
- La Iglesia
- Rocías
- La Roza
- Socueva
- Tabladillo
- Val del Asón
