= Rasines =

- Municipality
- Flag Coat of arms

- Location of Rasines

- Location in Spain
- Coordinates: 43°18′29″N 3°25′29″W
- Country: Spain
- Autonomous community: Cantabria
- Province: Cantabria
- Comarca: Asón-Agüera
- Judicial district: Laredo
- Capital: Rasines

Government
  - Alcalde: Jaime Bonachea Pico

Area
  - Total: 42.89 km^{2} (16.56 sq mi)
- Elevation: 90 m (300 ft)

Population (2025-01-01)
  - Total: 980
  - Density: 23/km^{2} (59/sq mi)
- Time zone: UTC+1 (CET)
  - Summer (DST): UTC+2 (CEST)

Rasines is a municipality located in the autonomous community of Cantabria, Spain.

== Localities ==
- Casavieja.
- Cereceda.
- El Cerro.
- La Edilla.
- Fresno.
- Helguera.
- Lombera.
- Ojébar.
- Rasines (Capital).
- Rocillo.
- Santa Cruz.
- Torcollano.
- La Vega.
- Villaparte.
