= Ramales de la Victoria =

- Municipality
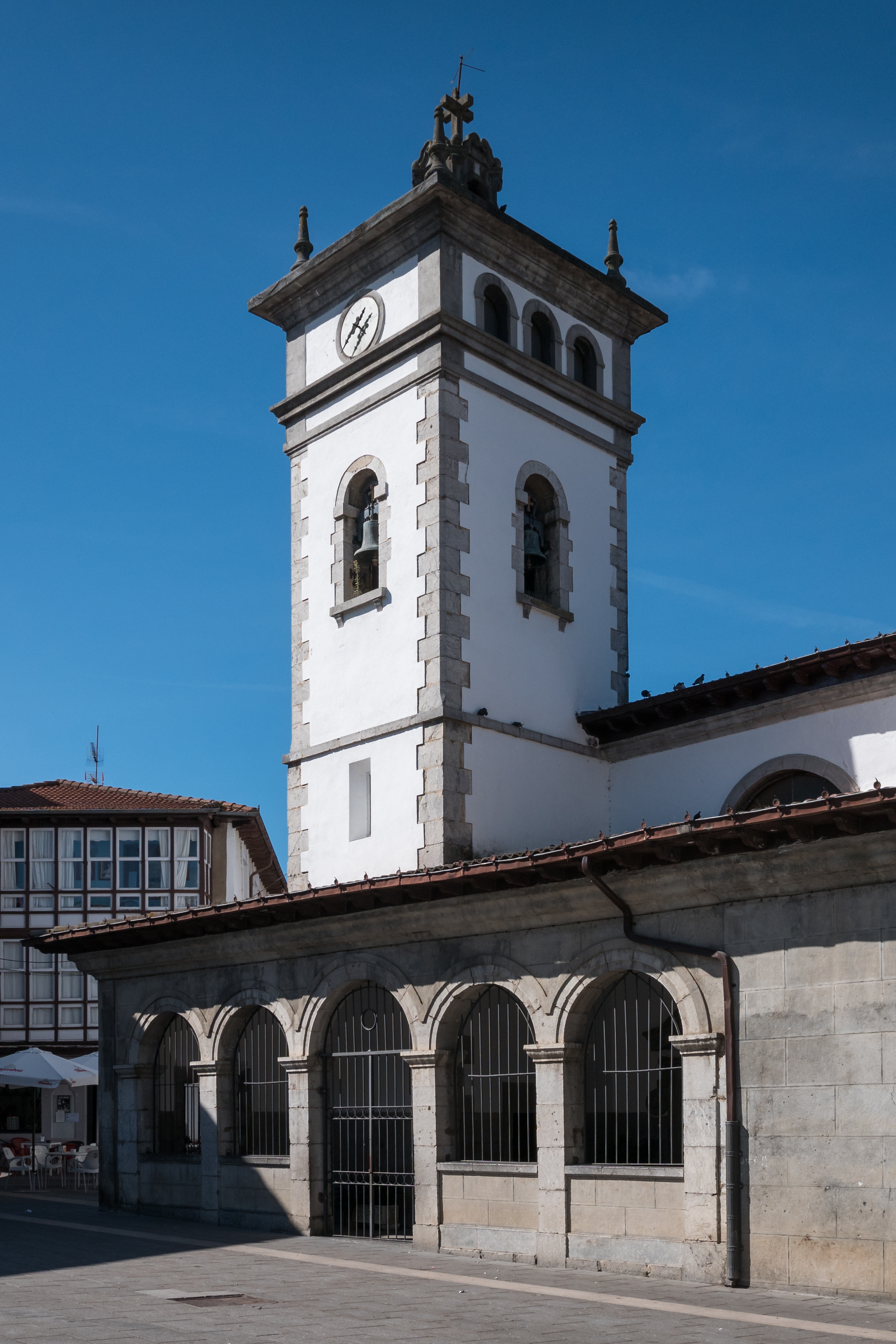
- Church of Saint Peter

- Flag Coat of arms

- Location in Spain
- Coordinates: 43°15′32″N 3°27′50″W
- Country: Spain
- Autonomous community: Cantabria
- Province: Cantabria
- Comarca: Asón
- Judicial district: Laredo

Government
  - Mayor: José Domingo San Emeterio Diego (2007) (PP)

Area
  - Total: 32.97 km^{2} (12.73 sq mi)
- Elevation: 84 m (276 ft)

Population (2025-01-01)
  - Total: 3,099
  - Density: 93.99/km^{2} (243.4/sq mi)
- Demonym: Ramaliegos
- Time zone: UTC+1 (CET)
  - Summer (DST): UTC+2 (CEST)
- Official language(s): Spanish
- Website: Official website

Ramales de La Victoria is a municipality located in the autonomous community of Cantabria, Spain. The Battle of Ramales took place here in 1839 during the First Carlist War.

== See also ==
- El Asón
- Gibaja
