= Soba, Spain =

Soba
- Municipality
- Flag Coat of arms

- Location in Cantabria.

- Location in Spain
- Coordinates: 43°11′17″N 3°31′2″W
- Country: Spain
- Autonomous community: Cantabria
- Province: Cantabria
- Comarca: Asón-Agüera

Government
  - Mayor: Julián José Fuentecilla García

Area
  - Total: 214.16 km^{2} (82.69 sq mi)
- Elevation: 330 m (1,080 ft)

Population (2025-01-01)
  - Total: 1,057
  - Density: 4.936/km^{2} (12.78/sq mi)
- Demonym: Sobanos
- Time zone: UTC+1 (CET)
  - Summer (DST): UTC+2 (CEST)
- Website: Official website

Soba is a municipality located in the autonomous community of Cantabria, Spain.
