= Ruesga =

Coordinates: 43°16′57″N 3°33′36″W

- Flag Coat of arms

- Location in Spain.
- Country: Spain
- Autonomous community: Cantabria

Area
  - Total: 87.96 km^{2} (33.96 sq mi)
- Elevation: 136 m (446 ft)

Population (2025-01-01)
  - Total: 810
  - Density: 9.2/km^{2} (24/sq mi)
- Time zone: UTC+1 (CET)
  - Summer (DST): UTC+2 (CEST)

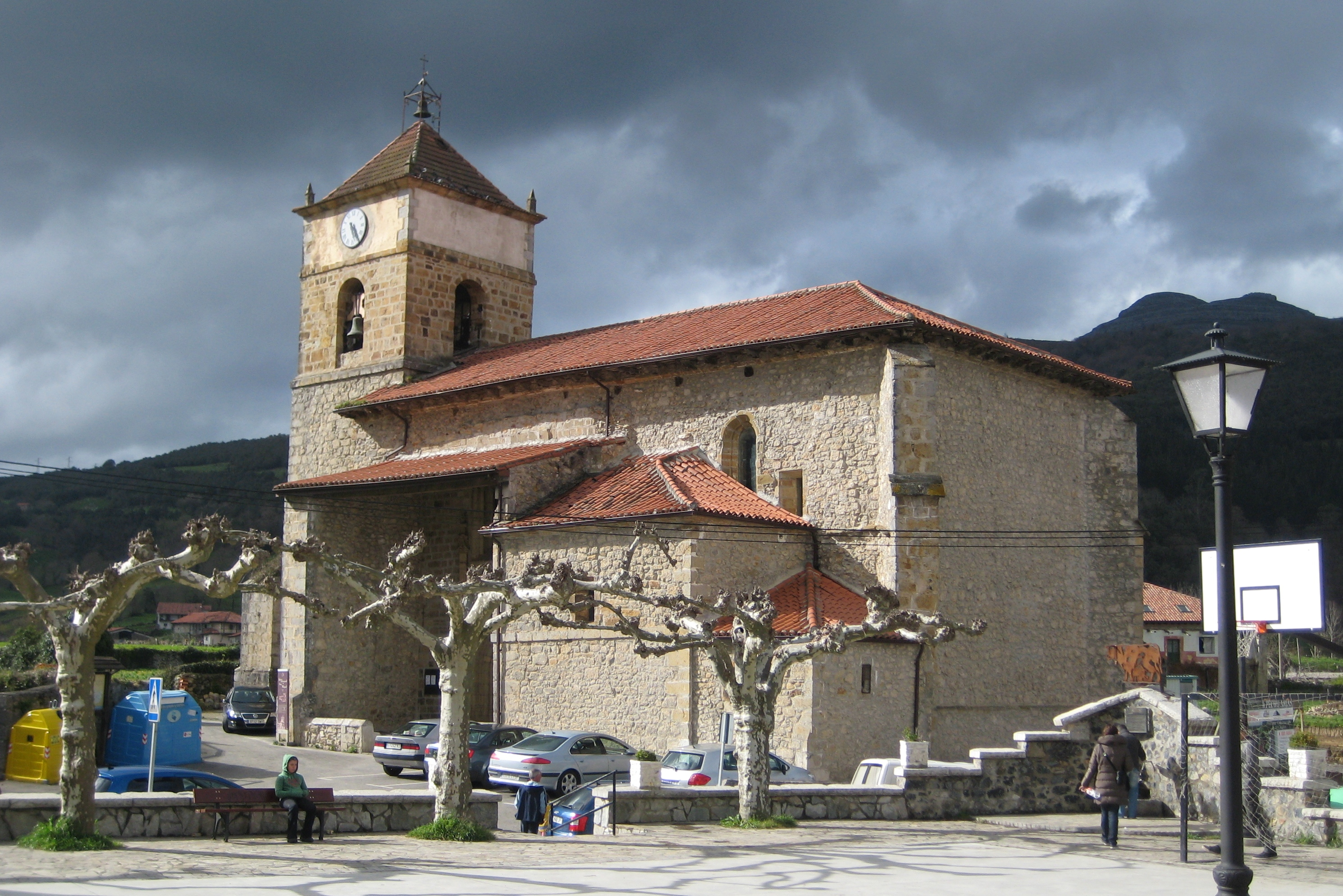
Saint Michael's Church and square in Ogarrio, Ruesga, Cantabria, Spain

Ruesga (Spanish pronunciation: [ˈrwesɣa]) is a municipality in Cantabria Province, Spain. It includes the following 6 villages: Calseca, Matienzo, Mentera Barruelo, Ogarrio, Riva (capital) and Valle. As of 2016, a total of 870 people lived in Ruesga. Its economy is primarily agriculture and forestry; livestock mountain or forestal exploitation of wealth employs 53.1% of the workforce. There were almost 5,000 heads of livestock spread over 198 farms. The unemployment rate was 14.7%.
