= Matienzo =

Village in Spain

Coordinates: 43°18′47″N 3°34′56″W

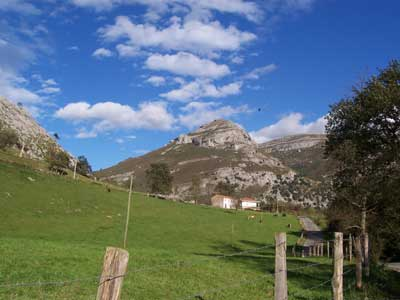

Matienzo is the name of a village and a karst depression some 25 km southeast of Santander in Ruesga municipality, Cantabria, northern Spain. The limestone around Matienzo is riddled with caves (up to 58.6 km in length) which have been extensively explored over the last 50 years by Spanish and British cavers.

As of December 2016 the total length of cave passage explored, was 377 km.
