= Torca del Carlista =

Limestone cavern in Cantabria, Spain

- Carlista Cavern
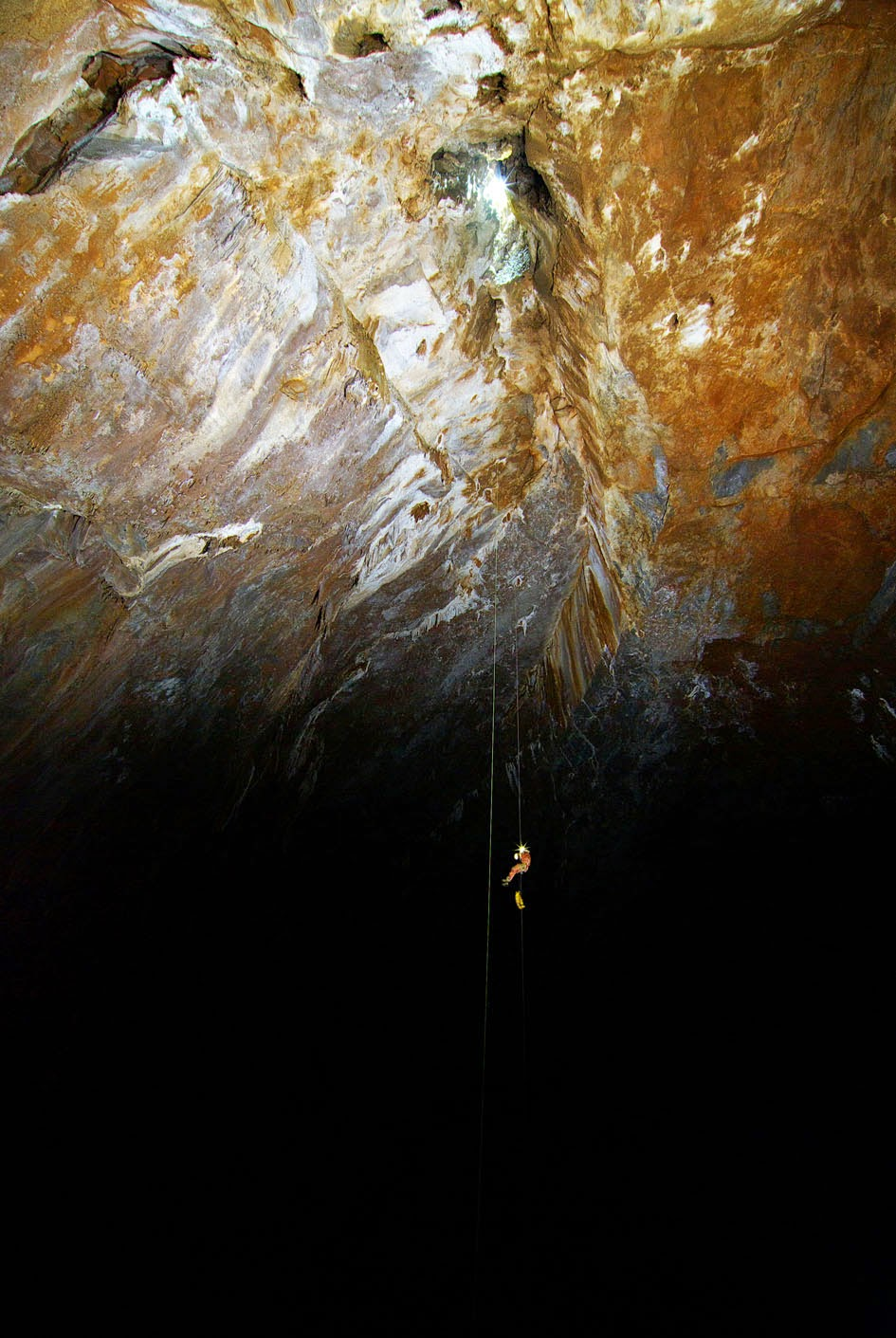
- Speleologist entering the Torca del Carlista cave

- Location within Spain
- Location: Cantabria, Spain
- Coordinates: 43°15′48.6″N 3°23′18.81″W
- Length: 520 metres (1,710 ft)
- Height variation: 120 metres (390 ft)
- Geology: Cretaceous limestone
- Cave survey: 1958

Torca del Carlista (English: Carlista Cavern) is a large limestone cavern found in Cantabria, Spain, approximately 35 kilometres (22 mi) from the city of Bilbao. The entrance, up the slopes of the Cantabrian Mountains, is only a single metre (3 feet) wide. The entry passage descends some 45 metres (148 ft) vertically in a narrow chimney before opening up into the cavern's main gallery. Some 520 metres (1,710 ft) long and 245 metres (804 ft) wide, the total surface area of the cavern exceeds 20 acres, or 76,620 square metres (824,700 sq ft). The main chamber is the fifth-largest underground chamber in the world, with a ceiling that reaches 120 metres (390 ft) at its highest point.

== History ==
The name Torca del Carlista likely comes from nearby Carlista Peak, a mountain named for the Spanish Carlist movement. Carlists supported Don Carlos, Count of Molina, as successor to the Spanish throne, and were opposed by Royalists. Local legend has it that an unnamed Carlist threw himself to death rather than surrender to the Royalists, and suggests that the cave was named for him.

The first attempt to enter the case was made in 1957 by cavers from the Grupo Espeleológico Vizcaino (GEV). The cave was first successfully explored in 1958 by a team of Spanish speleologists from Grupos Universitarios de Montaña (GUM). Access is presently restricted to experienced cavers only.

== Geology ==
The central gallery of the cave is called the GEV Grand Hall, in honor of the GEV cavers who first explored it. The two other galleries are named Iradier and Aranzadi.

Based on similar formations found in both, it is speculated that nearby Pozalagua Cave was a part of Torca del Carlista now separated by fallen rock.
