= Asón =

River in Spain

Coordinates: 43°12′10″N 3°35′06″W

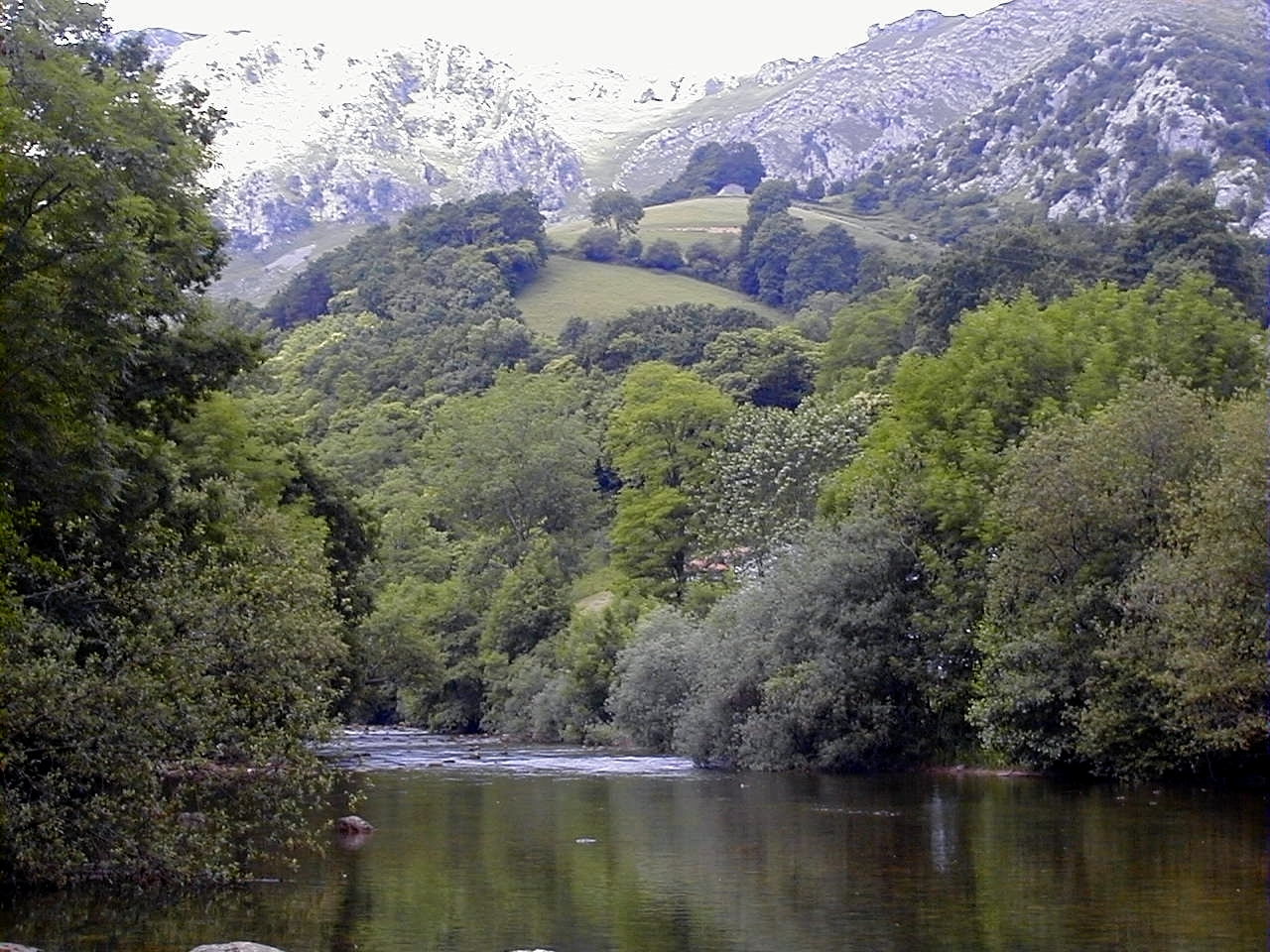
The Asón near Arredondo, Cantabria

The Asón is a river in Northern Spain, flowing through the Autonomous Community of Cantabria. Its source is in the Collados del Asón Natural Park. It flows into the Cantabrian Sea in the town of Colindres, where it forms the Santoña estuary which is the most important Special Protection Area in the north of Spain. It has a length of 39 km.

== See also ==
- Collados del Asón Natural Park
- Santoña, Victoria and Joyel Marshes Natural Park
