= OAS =

OAS or Oas may refer to:

== Chemistry ==
- O-Acetylserine, amino-acid involved in cysteine synthesis

== Computers ==
- Open-Architecture-System, the main user interface of Wersi musical keyboards
- OpenAPI Specification (originally Swagger Specification), specification for machine-readable interface files for RESTful Web services
- Oracle Application Server, software platform

== Medicine ==
- Open aortic surgery, surgical technique
- Oral allergy syndrome, food-related allergic reaction in the mouth
- 2'-5'-oligoadenylate synthase, an enzyme
  - OAS1, OAS2, OAS3, anti-viral enzymes in humans

== Organizations ==
- Office of Aviation Services, agency of the United States Department of the Interior
- Ontario Archaeological Society, organization promoting archaeology within the Province of Ontario, Canada
- Organisation Armée Secrète, French far-right paramilitary group, active during the Algerian War (1954–1962), fighting against Algerian independence
- Organization of American States, a voluntary continental organization of the Americas
- Oxford Art Society, society for artists in the city of Oxford, England

== Transport ==
- Oasis LRT station, Singapore, LRT station abbreviation OAS

== Other ==
- Ohio Auction School, school for auctioneers in Ohio, U.S.
- Old Age Security, social security payment available to most Canadians aged 65 or older
- Option-adjusted spread, the yield-curve spread of a fixed-income security, adjusted for the cost of embedded options
- Oas, Albay, municipality in the Philippines

== See also ==
- Oaş (disambiguation)
