= OASL =

Protein-coding gene in the species Homo sapiens

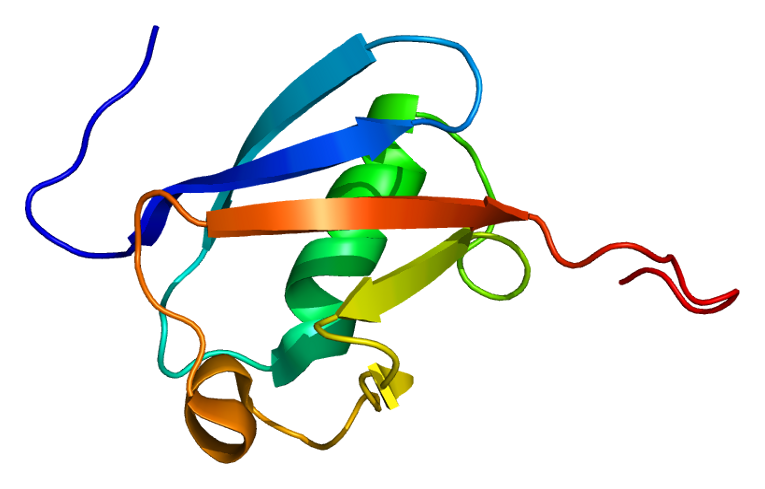

Identifiers
- Aliases: OASL, OASLd, TRIP-14, TRIP14, p59 p59-p592'-5'-oligoadenylate synthetase like, OASL1
- External IDs: OMIM: 603281; MGI: 2180849; GeneCards: OASL
Available structures
PDB	Ortholog search: PDBe RCSB
PDB	List of PDB id codes 1WH3, 4XQ7

Gene location (Human)
Chr.	Chromosome 12 (human)
Band	12q24.31	Start	121,017,763 bp
Band	12q24.31	End	121,039,242 bp

Gene location (Mouse)
Chr.	Chromosome 5 (mouse)
Band	5|5 F	Start	115,061,299 bp
Band	5|5 F	End	115,075,974 bp
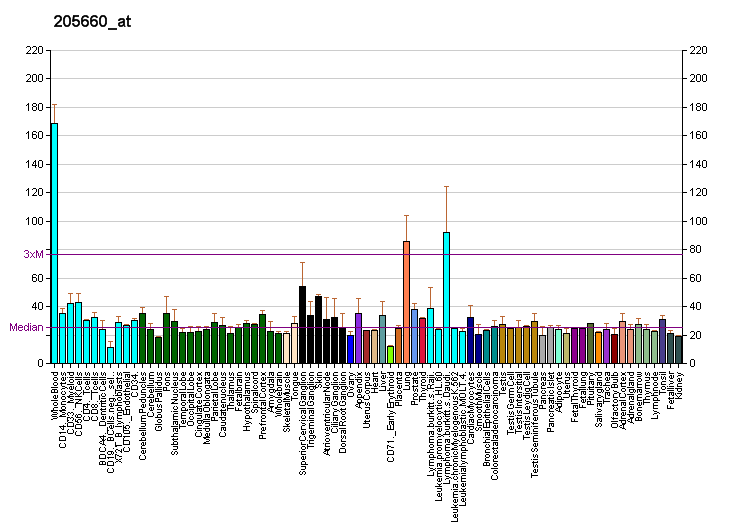

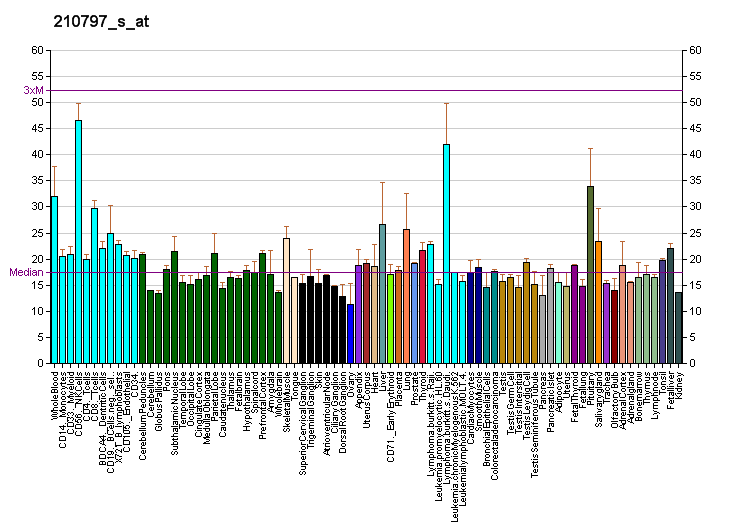
RNA expression pattern
Bgee	Human / Mouse (ortholog); Top expressed in: granulocyte; blood; pancreatic ductal cell; monocyte; mucosa of ileum; mucosa of transverse colon; decidua; right lung; right lobe of liver; bone marrow / Top expressed in: pyloric antrum; mucous cell of stomach; intestinal villus; epithelium of stomach; duodenum; jejunum; granulocyte; ileum; large intestine; colon; More reference expression data
BioGPS	More reference expression data
Gene ontology
Molecular function	transferase activity; DNA binding; thyroid hormone receptor binding; 2'-5'-oligoadenylate synthetase activity; double-stranded RNA binding; ATP binding; RNA binding
Cellular component	cytoplasm; membrane; nucleolus; nucleus; nucleoplasm; cytosol
Biological process	immune system process; interferon-gamma-mediated signaling pathway; response to virus; negative regulation of viral genome replication; type I interferon signaling pathway; immune response; innate immune response; defense response to virus; regulation of ribonuclease activity
Sources:Amigo / QuickGO
Orthologs
Databases	NCBI: entry; OMA: entry
Species	Human	Mouse
Entrez	8638	231655
Ensembl	ENSG00000135114	ENSMUSG00000041827
UniProt	Q15646	Q8VI94
RefSeq (mRNA)	NM_198213; NM_001261825; NM_003733; NM_001395418; NM_001395419	NM_145209; NM_001359945; NM_001359946
RefSeq (protein)	NP_001248754; NP_003724; NP_937856	NP_660210; NP_001346874; NP_001346875
Location (UCSC)	Chr 12: 121.02 – 121.04 Mb	Chr 5: 115.06 – 115.08 Mb
PubMed search
- Wikidata
View/Edit Human	View/Edit Mouse

59 kDa 2'-5'-oligoadenylate synthetase-like protein is an enzyme that in humans is encoded by the OASL gene. It enhances antiviral innate immunity by acting as a RIG-I signaling amplifier.

2'-5'-oligoadenylate synthase is a protein family of structurally similar proteins, including OAS1, OAS2, and OAS3. However, mutations in the OAS domain mean it lacks the motif to allow oligomerization, preventing the synthesis of oligoadenylates. OASL, like the proteins of 2'-5'-oligoadenylate synthase family, is induced by interferons.

== Function ==
=== RNA virus infection ===
In RNA virus infection, viral genetic material binds to the RNA sensor RIG-I, triggering a reaction cascade that culminates in the secretion of type I interferons. OASL acts as a sensitiser of RIG-I, binding to the caspase activation and recruitment domain and enhancing interferon production.

=== DNA virus infection ===
While OASL has an anti-viral role in RNA viral infection, it has also demonstrated a pro-viral role in DNA viral infection. OASL can bind to the viral DNA sensor cGAS, inhibiting its catalytic activity and preventing the secretion of interferons.

=== Intracellular bacterial infection ===
OASL is shown to be upregulated during a wide variety of vacuolar and cytosolic bacterial infections. It possesses an ability to inhibit autophagic mechanisms and antimicrobial peptide secretion within the host cell through unclear mechanisms, preventing clearance of the pathogen and creating a favourable intracellular environment.

== See also ==
- Oasl2, a mouse gene, which is a paralog of mouse gene Oasl1, the ortholog of this gene
