= List of first human settlements =

Overview map of the peopling of the world by anatomically modern humans (numbers indicate dates in thousands of years ago [kya])

This is a list of dates associated with the prehistoric peopling of the world (the first known presence of Homo sapiens).

The list is divided into four categories: Middle Paleolithic (before 50,000 years ago), Upper Paleolithic (50,000 to 12,500 years ago), Holocene (12,500 to 500 years ago) and Modern (Age of Sail and modern exploration). List entries are identified by region (in the case of genetic evidence spatial resolution is limited), country or island, with the date of the first known or hypothesised modern human presence (or "settlement", although Paleolithic humans were not sedentary).

Human "settlement" does not necessarily have to be continuous; settled areas in some cases become depopulated due to environmental conditions, such as glacial periods or the Toba volcanic eruption. Early Homo sapiens migrated out of Africa from as early as 270,000 years ago, although these early migrations may have died out and permanent Homo sapiens presence outside Africa may not have been established until about 70–50,000 years ago.

== Middle Paleolithic ==
Before Homo sapiens, Homo erectus had already spread throughout Africa and non-Arctic Eurasia by about one million years ago. The oldest known evidence for anatomically modern humans (as of 2017) are fossils found at Jebel Irhoud, Morocco, dated to about 360,000 years old.

Region	Country	Date (kya)	Place	Notes	Ref(s)
Africa, North Africa	Morocco	379-254	Jebel Irhoud	Anatomically modern human remains of eight individuals dated 300,000 years old, making them the oldest known remains categorized as "modern" (as of 2018).	
Asia, West Asia	Turkey	316–219	Neanderthal admixture	Genetic evidence for early Homo sapiens admixture to Neanderthals in West Asia, discovered in 2017.	
Asia, South Asia	India	385–250	South India	Quartzite tools excavated at Attirampakkam were dated back to 250,000-385,000 years old.	
Africa, Horn of Africa	Ethiopia	200–190	Omo Kibish Formation	The Omo remains of modern humans found in 1967 near the Ethiopian Kibish Mountains, dated stratigraphically to 195 ± 5 ka, may be related to Ledi-Geraru.	
Asia, West Asia	Israel	195–177	Misliya Cave, Mount Carmel	Fossil maxilla is apparently older than remains found at Skhyul and Qafzeh. Layers dating from between 250,000 and 140,000 years ago in the same cave contained tools of the Levallois type, which could put the date of the first migration even earlier if the tools can be associated with the modern human jawbone finds.	
Africa, Southern Africa	South Africa	200–110	Klasies River Caves, population genetics	Remains found in the Klasies River Caves in the Eastern Cape province of South Africa show signs of human hunting dated c. 125 ka. There is some debate as to whether these remains represent anatomically modern humans. Evidence from population genetics suggests separation before 110 ka, most likely between 130 and 200 ka.	
Africa, East Africa	Sudan	160–140	Singa	Anatomically modern human discovered 1924 with rare temporal bone pathology	
Asia, West Asia, Arabia	United Arab Emirates	125	Jebel Faya	Stone tools made by anatomically modern humans (discovered 2011).	
Asia, West Asia, Arabia	Oman	125–75	Aybut	Tools found in the Dhofar Governorate correspond with African objects from the so-called 'Nubian Complex', dating from 75 to 125,000 years ago. According to archaeologist Jeffrey I. Rose, human settlements spread east from Africa across the Arabian Peninsula.	
Africa, Central Africa	Democratic Republic of the Congo	90	Katanda, Upper Semliki River	Semliki harpoon heads carved from bone.	
Asia, South Asia	India	80	Central India	Archaeological excavation carried out in the trenches at Dhaba in the upper Son river valley found stone tools and other evidences of human occupation in this area 80,000 years back.	
Asia, East Asia	China, PRC	80	Fuyan Cave	Teeth were found under rock over which 80,000 years old stalagmites had grown.	
Africa, North Africa	Libya	80–65	Haua Fteah	Fragments of 2 mandibles discovered in 1953	
Asia, South Asia	Sri Lanka	70–66	population genetics	Genetic evidence suggests first settlement 70–66 kya. Available fossil evidence from Sri Lanka has been dated to 34 kya.	
Asia, Southeast Asia	Sumatra, Indonesia	73–63	Lida Ajer cave	Teeth found in Sumatra in the 19th century	
Asia, Southeast Asia	Luzon, Philippines	67	Callao Cave	Mijares and Piper (2010) found bones in a cave near Peñablanca, Cagayan, originally thought to be modern human. However, these were subsequently dated ca. 134 kya, belonging to a different species, Homo luzonensis.	
Africa, North Africa	Egypt	50–80	Taramasa Hill	Skeleton of 8- to 10-year-old child discovered in 1994	
Australia	Arnhem Land, Australia	65–50	Madjedbebe	The oldest human skeletal remains are the 40ky old Lake Mungo remains in New South Wales, but human ornaments discovered at Devil's Lair in Western Australia have been dated to 48 kya and artifacts at Madjedbebe in Northern Territory are dated to at least 50 kya, and to 62.1±2.9 ka (95% CI) in one 2017 study.	

== Upper Paleolithic ==
Region	Country / island	Date (kya)	Place	Notes	Ref(s)
South America	Northeast Region, Brazil	56–41?	Pedra Furada	Hypothetical Pleistocene peopling of the Americas: charcoal from the oldest layers yielded dates of 41,000–56,000 BP.	
Asia, East Asia	Honshu, Japan	47	Lake Nojiri	Genetic research indicates arrival of humans in Japan by 37,000 BP. Archeological remains at the Tategahana Paleolithic Site at Lake Nojiri have been dated as early as 47,000 BP.	
Asia, Southeast Asia, Indochina	Laos	46	Tam Pa Ling Cave	In 2009 an ancient skull was recovered from a cave in the Annamite Mountains in northern Laos which is at least 46,000 years old, making it the oldest modern human fossil found to date in Southeast Asia	
Europe		46–43		The earliest known remains of Cro-Magnon-like humans are radiocarbon dated to 43,000–46,000 BP, found in Bulgaria, Italy, and Great Britain.	
Europe	Bulgaria	46-44	Bacho Kiro cave	A tooth and six bone fragments are the earliest modern human remains yet found in Europe.	
Europe	Italy	45–44	Grotta del Cavallo, Apulia	Two baby teeth discovered in Apulia in 1964.	
Europe	Great Britain, United Kingdom	44–41	Kents Cavern	Human jaw fragment found in Torquay, Devon in 1927	
Europe	Germany	43–42	Geißenklösterle, Baden-Württemberg	Three Paleolithic flutes belonging to the early Aurignacian, which is associated with the assumed earliest presence of Homo sapiens in Europe (Cro-Magnon). It is the oldest example of prehistoric music.	
Europe, Baltic	Lithuania	43–41	Šnaukštai near Gargždai	A hammer made from reindeer horn similar to those used by the Bromme culture was found in 2016. The discovery pushed back the earliest evidence of human presence in Lithuania by 30,000 years, i.e. to before the last glacial period.	
Asia, Southeast Asia	East Timor	42	Jerimalai cave	Fish bones	
Australia	Tasmania	41	Jordan River Levee	Optically stimulated luminescence results from the site suggest a date ca. 41,000 BP. Rising sea level left Tasmania isolated after 8000 BP.	
Asia, Southeast Asia	Borneo, Malaysia	46–34?	Niah Cave	A human skull in Sarawak, Borneo (Archaeologists have claimed a much earlier date for stone tools found in the Mansuli valley, near Lahad Datu in Sabah, but precise dating analysis has not yet been published.)	
Asia, Southeast Asia	New Guinea	40	Indonesian Side of New Guinea	Archaeological evidence shows that 40,000 years ago, some of the first farmers came to New Guinea from the South-East Asian Peninsula.	
Europe	Romania	42–38	Peștera cu Oase		
Asia, East Asia	Hong Kong, PRC	39	Wong Tei Tung	Optically stimulated luminescence results from the site suggest a date ca. 39,000 BP.	
Europe	Russia	40–35?	Mamontovaya Kurya	Earliest evidence of human (not necessarily anatomically modern humans) presence at Arctic latitudes.	
Asia, Central Asia, Tibetan Plateau	Tibet, PRC	38	Salween River	Formerly dated to 15 kya, the date modern human presence in Tibet has been pushed back to at least 38 kya based on genetic evidence. Archaeological evidence from the bank of the Salween River in the southeastern Tibetan Plateau was dated between 32 and 39 kya.	
Asia, South Asia	Sri Lanka	34	Fa Hien Cave	The earliest remains of anatomically modern man, based on radiocarbon dating of charcoal, have been found in the Fa Hien Cave in western Sri Lanka.	
North America	Canada	40–25?	Bluefish Caves	Hypothetical Pleistocene peopling of the Americas: Human-worked mammoth bone flakes found at Bluefish Caves, Yukon.	
Asia, East Asia	Okinawa	32	Yamashita-cho cave, Naha city	Bone artifacts and an ash seam dated to 32,000±1000 BP.	
Europe	France	32	Chauvet Cave	The cave paintings in the Chauvet Cave in southern France have been called the earliest known cave art, though the dating is uncertain.	
Europe	Czech Republic	31	Mladeč caves	Oldest human bones that clearly represent a human settlement in Europe.	
Europe	Poland	30	Obłazowa Cave	A boomerang made from mammoth tusk	
Asia, Southeast Asia	Buka Island, New Guinea	28	Kilu Cave	Flaked stone, bone, and shell artifacts	
Asia, East Asia	Taiwan, Republic of China	30–20		In 1972, fragmentary fossils of anatomically modern humans were found at Chouqu and Gangzilin, in Zuojhen District, Tainan, in fossil beds exposed by erosion of the Cailiao River. Though some of the fragments are believed to be more recent, three cranial fragments and a molar tooth have been dated as between 20,000 and 30,000 years old. The find has been dubbed "Zuozhen Man". No associated artifacts have been found at the site.	
Europe	Portugal	25	Abrigo do Lagar Velho	Possible Neanderthal/Cro-Magnon hybrid, the Lapedo child	
North America	United States	22	Lake Otero	Human footprints in White Sands National Park in New Mexico. Stone, bone, and wood artifacts and animal and plant remains dating to 16,000 BP in Meadowcroft Rockshelter, Washington County, Pennsylvania. (Earlier claims have been made, but not corroborated, for 50,000 BP at sites such as Topper, South Carolina.)	
Europe	Sicily	20	San Teodoro cave	Human cranium dated by gamma-ray spectrometry	
South America	Chile	18.5-14.5	Monte Verde	Carbon dating of remains from this site represent the oldest known settlement in South America.	
South America	Peru	14	Pikimachay	Stone and bone artifacts found in a cave of the Ayacucho complex	
North America	Santa Rosa Island	13	Arlington Springs site	Arlington Springs Man discovered in 1959. The four northern Channel Islands of California were once conjoined into one island, Santa Rosae	

== Holocene ==
Region	Country / island	Date	Place	Notes	Ref(s)
Europe, British Isles	Ireland, Republic of Ireland	12,500 BP	Gwendoline Cave	The patella of a bear, which was subject to butchering close to the time of death has been radiocarbon dated to 10,500 BCE	
Mediterranean	Cyprus	12,500 BP	Aetokremnos	Burned bones of megafauna	
Americas, South America	Colombia	12,500 BP	El Abra	Stone, bone and charcoal artifacts	
Americas, North America	British Columbia	12,000 BP	Triquet Island		
Europe, Scandinavia	Norway	11,000 BP	Aukra	The oldest remnants of the so-called Fosna culture were found in Aukra Municipality in Møre og Romsdal.	
Americas, South America	Argentina	11,000 BP	Piedra Museo	Spear heads and human fossils	
Europe, Baltic	Estonia	11,000 BP	Pulli	The Pulli settlement on the bank of the Pärnu River briefly pre-dates that at Kunda, which gave its name to the Kunda culture.	
Europe	Scotland	10,500 BP	Cramond, near Edinburgh	The oldest human settlement found in Scotland dates to 8500 BCE.	
Atlantic / Central Africa	Bioko, Equatorial Guinea	10,000 BP		Early Bantu migration	
Asia, Southeast Asia, Indochina	Cambodia	9,000 BP	Laang Spean	Laang Spean cave in the Stung Sangker River valley, Battambang Province	
Arctic, New Siberian Islands	Zhokhov Island	8,300 BP		Hunting tools and animal remains in the High Arctic; later abandoned and still uninhabited	
Pacific	Tuvalu	8,000 BP?	Caves of Nanumanga	Evidence of fire in a submerged cave last accessible 8000 BP. Polynesian settlement around 3000 BP in Tuvalu	
Mediterranean	Malta	7,250 BP	Għar Dalam	Settlers from Sicily brought agriculture and impressed ware pottery.	
Americas, Caribbean	Trinidad	7,000 BP	Banwari Trace	Stone and bone artifacts mark the oldest archaeological site in the Caribbean.	
Americas, Caribbean	Puerto Rico	6,000 BP	Angostura site	Carbon dating of burial site	
Arctic, North America	Greenland	4,000 BP	Saqqaq	Saqqaq culture was the first of several waves of settlement from northern Canada and from Scandinavia.	
Arctic, North America	Baffin Island, Canada	4,000 BP	Pond Inlet	In 1969, Pre-Dorset remains were discovered, with seal bones radiocarbon dated to 2035 BCE	
Asia, Central Asia	Xinjiang, PRC	3,800 BP?	Tarim Basin	Tarim mummies	
Pacific	Mariana Islands	3,500 BP?	Unai Bapot, Saipan	Pottery similar to that from nowadays Philippines has been discovered. This was the longest human ocean voyage at the time.	
Arctic, Siberia	Wrangel Island	3,400 BP	Chertov Ovrag	Sea-mammal hunting tools; later abandoned, with intermittent settlements 1914–present	
Pacific	Tonga	3,180 BP	Pea village on Tongatapu	Radiocarbon dating of a shell found at the site dates the occupation at 3180±100 BP.	
Pacific	Fiji	3,000 BP	Bourewa, Nadroga	Radiocarbon dating of a shell midden at Bourewa on Viti Levu Island shows earliest inhabitation at 1220–970 BCE.	
Atlantic / North Africa	Canary Islands	3,000 BP		Genetic studies show relation to Moroccan Berbers, but precise date uncertain.	
Pacific	Vanuatu	3,000 BP	Teouma etc.	Lapita pottery found at Teouma cemetery on Efate and on several other islands.	
Pacific	Samoa	3,000 BP	Mulifanua	Lapita site found at Mulifanua Ferry Berth Site by New Zealand scientists in the 1970s.	
Pacific	Hawaii	1,700 BP	Ka Lae	Early settlement from the Marquesas Islands	
Pacific	Line Islands	1,600 BP		When Polynesian traders travelling to and from Hawaii	
Indian Ocean / East Africa	Madagascar	1,500 BP		The population of Madagascar seems to have derived in equal measures from Borneo and East Africa.	
Atlantic / Northern Europe	Faroe Islands	1,500 BP		Agricultural remains from three locations were analysed and dated to as early as the sixth century CE	
Indian Ocean / East Africa	Comoros	1,450 BP		Austronesian settlers arrived no later than the 6th century, based on archaeological evidence on Nzwani; settlement beginning as early as the 1st century has been postulated.	
Americas, Caribbean	Bahamas	1,100 BP	Three Dog Site (SS21), San Salvador Island	Excavated midden includes quartz and Ostionoid ceramic artifacts, wood and seed remains, etc., dated to 800–900.	
Pacific	Huahine, Society Islands (French Polynesia)	1,140 BP	Fa'ahia	Bird bones dated to 1140±90 BP	
Atlantic / Northern Europe	Iceland	CE 874 / 1,076 BP	Reykjavík	Ingólfr Arnarson, the first known Norse settler who came from mainland Norway, built his homestead in Reykjavík this year, though Norse or Hiberno-Scottish monks might have arrived up to two hundred years earlier.	
Pacific	Easter Island	CE 750–1150 / 1,200–800 BP	Anakena	Settled by voyagers from the Marquesas Islands, possibly as early as CE 300.	
Pacific	New Zealand	CE 1250 / 700 BP	Wairau Bar	It is generally accepted that the islands were permanently settled by Eastern Polynesians (the ancestors of the Māori) who arrived about 1250–1300.	
Pacific	Norfolk Island	CE 1250 / 700 BP	Emily Bay	Settled by Polynesians, later abandoned. Resettled by British 1788.	
Pacific	Auckland Islands	CE 1250 / 700 BP	Sandy Bay, Enderby Island	Settled by Polynesians, later abandoned. Resettled from the Chatham Islands in 1842, later abandoned.	
Pacific	Kermadec Islands	CE 1350 / 600 BP		Settled by Polynesians by the 14th century (possibly previously, around the 10th century), later abandoned. Resettled by Europeans in 1810, later abandoned.	
Atlantic / North Africa	Madeira	CE 1420 / 530 BP		Settlers from Portugal.	
Atlantic	Azores	CE 1439 / 511 BP	Santa Maria Island	Settlers from Portugal led by Gonçalo Velho Cabral.	
Atlantic / West Africa	Cape Verde	CE 1462 / 488 BP	Cidade Velha	Settlers from Portugal founded the city as "Ribeira Grande."	
Atlantic / Central Africa	São Tomé and Príncipe	CE 1485 / 465 BP	São Tomé	Portuguese settlement in 1485 failed but was followed in 1493 by a successful settlement led by Álvaro Caminha.	

== Modern ==
Sea / region	Island	Date	Place	Notes	Ref(s)
Pacific Ocean	Chatham Islands	1500		Moriori settlers from New Zealand. This was the last wave of Polynesian migrations.	
South Atlantic	Saint Helena	1516		Settled by Fernão Lopes (soldier). Later populated by escaped slaves from Mozambique and Java, then by English in 1659.	
South Atlantic / Central Africa	Annobón	1543		Alvaro da Cunha requested Portuguese royal charter in 1543 and by 1559 had settled Africans slaves there.	
North Atlantic	Bermuda	1609		Settled by English survivors of the Sea Venture shipwreck, led by George Somers.	
Arctic, Northern Europe	Svalbard	1619	Smeerenburg	Settled by Dutch and Danish whalers 1619–1657. Longyearbyen founded 1906 and continuously inhabited except for World War II.	
Indian Ocean	Mauritius	1638	Vieux Grand Port	First settled by Dutch under Cornelius Gooyer.	
Indian Ocean	Réunion	1642		Settled 1642 by a dozen deported French mutineers from Madagascar, who were returned to France several years later. In 1665 the French East India Company started a permanent settlement.	
Americas, Caribbean	Cayman Islands	1658		While Christopher Columbus was first to sight the Cayman Islands on May 10, 1503, Caymanian folklore holds that the island's first inhabitants were English soldiers involved in Oliver Cromwell's capture of Jamaica around 1658. The first recorded permanent inhabitant was Isaac Bodden, the grandson of one of these first settlers, born on Grand Cayman around 1661.	
Indian Ocean	Rodrigues	1691		Settled 1691 by a small group of French Huguenots led by François Leguat; abandoned 1693. The French settled slaves there in the 18th century.	
East Pacific	Clipperton Island	1725		A short settlement in 1725. Intermittent settlement during the 19th and 20th centuries.	
East Pacific	Juan Fernández Islands	1750	San Juan Bautista	Settled by the Spanish to prevent its use by foreign powers and pirates. Destroyed in 1751 by a tsunami but soon rebuilt.	
South Atlantic	Falkland Islands	1764	Port Louis	Settled by French (as "Port Saint Louis") during the expedition of Louis Antoine de Bougainville.	
Indian Ocean	Seychelles	1770	Ste. Anne Island	Although visited earlier by Maldivians, Malays and Arabs, the first known settlement was a spice plantation established by the French, first on Ste. Anne Island, then moved to Mahé. It is the sovereign state with the shortest history of human settlement (followed by Mauritius).	
East Pacific	Floreana Island	1805	Black Beach	First settled 1805–1809 by Patrick Watkins. Later attempts in 1837, 1893, 1925, and 1929.	
South Atlantic	Tristan da Cunha	1810		First settled by Jonathan Lambert and two other men. Continuously inhabited since then except 1961–1963 evacuation due to volcano.	
South Atlantic	Ascension Island	1815		Settled as a British military garrison. Some prior shipwrecked sailors in 18th century.	
Pacific Ocean, Bering Sea	Commander Islands	1825		Russians brought Aleuts from Atka Island and Attu Island to settle Bering Island and Medny Island.	.
Indian Ocean	Cocos (Keeling) Islands	c. 1826		Settled c. 1826 by Alexander Hare and in 1827 by John Clunies-Ross.	
Pacific Ocean	Bonin Islands	1830	Port Lloyd, Chichi-jima	Some evidence of early settlement from the Marianas, but the islands were abandoned except for occasional shipwrecks until a group of Europeans, Polynesians, and Micronesians settled Chichi-jima in 1830.	
Pacific Ocean, Tasman Sea	Lord Howe Island	1834	Blinky Beach	Whaling supply station.	
Indian Ocean	Île Saint-Paul	1843		Although now uninhabited, there have been attempts at settlement. In June 1843, a French garrison was established under the command of Polish-born Captain Adam Mierolawski, but it was soon abandoned. In 1928, a spiny lobster cannery was established, with the last three settlers rescued in 1934.	
Arctic, Northern Europe	Novaya Zemlya	1870	Malye Karmakuly	Earlier overwinterings dating back to 16th century	
Indian Ocean	Île Amsterdam	1871	Camp Heurtin	Following various shipwrecks and visits by sealers and scientists in the 18th and 19th century, a short-lived settlement was made in 1871 by Heurtin, a French resident of Réunion Island. A French scientific base has been maintained since 1949.	
Pacific Ocean	Minami-Tori-shima	1886		Despite visits dating back to the 17th century, the first permanent settlement was in 1886.	
Indian Ocean	Christmas Island	1888	Flying Fish Cove	First European settlement established by George Clunies-Ross and John Murray with phosphate mining begun around 10 years later.	
Pacific Ocean	Campbell Island	1896		Sheep farming was undertaken from 1896 until the lease, along with the sheep and a small herd of cattle, was abandoned in 1931 because of the Great Depression.	
Pacific Ocean, Philippine Sea	Daitō Islands	1900	Minamidaitōjima	Tamaki Hanemon obtained the approval to develop two of islands from Empire of Japan	
Antarctic	South Orkney Islands	1903	Omond House	Visited by sealers and whalers in the 19th century. Scientific base founded by Scottish National Antarctic Expedition and sold to Argentina in 1904.	
South Atlantic	South Georgia	1904	Grytviken	Visited by sealers in the 19th century. Carl Anton Larsen founded a permanent whaling station in 1904.	
Arctic, Northern Europe	Jan Mayen	1921	Eggøya	Visited by whalers in the 17th century, with some overwinter sojourns in 1633, 1882, and 1907. Weather station at Eggøya established 1921, followed by other weather and military stations. The current station, Olonkinbyen, has been continuously inhabited since 1958.	
Indian Ocean	Kerguelen Islands	1927	Port-Couvreux	After occasional sojourns and shipwrecks in the 19th century, three families settled in a sheep-farming colony but were evacuated in 1934. Scientific station at Port-aux-Français has been continuously inhabited since 1950.	
Arctic, New Siberian Islands	Kotelny Island	1933		Soviet Naval Base.	
Antarctic	South Shetland Islands	1947	Captain Arturo Prat Base	Visited by sealers and explorers in the 19th century. Chilean naval base staffed continuously 1947–2004.	
Indian Ocean	Prince Edward Islands	1947	Transvaal Cove	Visited by sealers and shipwrecks in the 19th century. South Africa occupied the islands in 1947 and established a meteorological station.	
Antarctica		1948	Base General Bernardo O'Higgins Riquelme, Antarctic Peninsula	First permanent base in continental Antarctica, operated by the Chilean Army.	
Pacific Ocean	Macquarie Island	1948	Macquarie Island Station	Occasional sojourns and shipwrecks in the 19th century, continuously inhabited since 1948.	
East Pacific	Revillagigedo Islands	1957	Socorro Island	Mexican naval base established. Shorter stays in 19th and early 20th centuries	
Indian Ocean	Crozet Islands	1963	Alfred Faure	Occasional shipwrecks and visiting sealers and whalers in the 19th century, continuously inhabited since 1963.	
Arctic, Siberia	Severnaya Zemlya	1974	Cape Baranov	A meteorological station was operated from 1974 to 1988. "Prima" Polar Station opened at some point in the 1980s.	
North Atlantic / British Isles	Rockall	1985		Former SAS member Tom McClean lived on the island from 26 May to 4 July 1985 to affirm the UK's claim to the islet. Other short stays have been made, including one by Greenpeace and a 60-day fundraising effort for Help for Heroes	

== See also ==
- Early human migrations
- Pre-modern human migration
- Human evolution
- List of human evolution fossils
- Timeline of human evolution
- Timeline of prehistory
- Timeline of space exploration
