= Interbreeding between archaic and modern humans =

Human hybridization during the Paleolithic

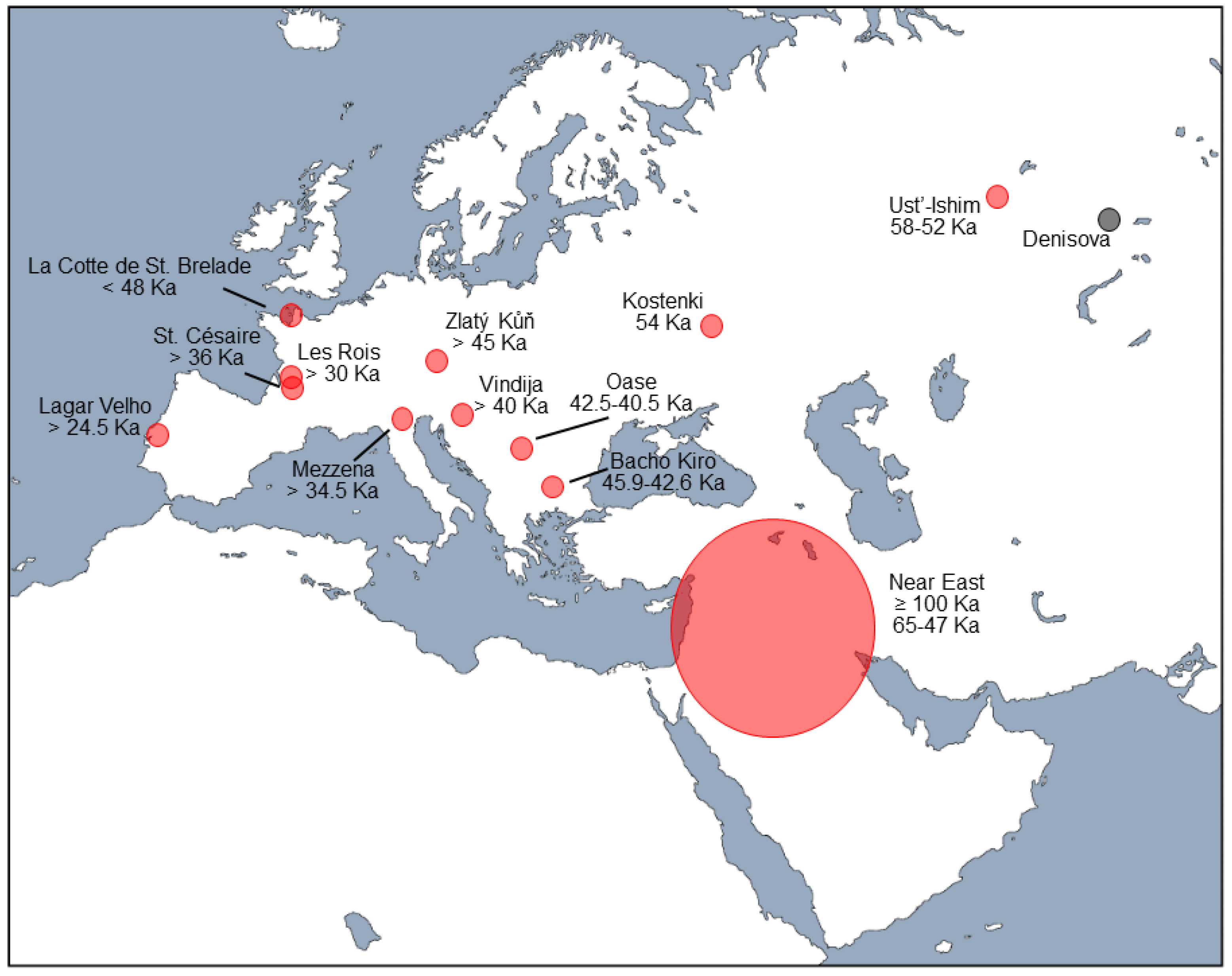
Map showing the areas of Eurasia and date ranges in which Homo neanderthalensis (an archaic human group) and Homo sapiens (the only extant human group) are estimated to have produced hybrids with each other. Data is based on analyses of human fossil samples at the indicated sites.

Interbreeding between archaic humans (such as Neanderthals and Denisovans) and anatomically modern humans (contemporaneous Homo sapiens) took place during the Middle Paleolithic and early Upper Paleolithic. It has been revealed via genomic sequencing that all modern human populations outside of Africa today carry approximately 1–4% Neanderthal DNA, which is a result of genetic admixture that occurred after modern humans migrated out of Africa. Denisovan admixture is most prominent in Oceania, where modern human populations derive approximately 4–6% of their genome from this archaic group, while those in Eurasia and the Americas have been found to be carrying lower levels.

Within Africa, successive Eurasian back-migrations that continued into the Neolithic introduced Neanderthal DNA to the modern human populations of North Africa, and while it was initially thought to be completely absent in the modern human populations of sub-Saharan Africa, low levels of Neanderthal DNA from these back-migrations have since been identified among them as well.

The introgression of archaic human DNA has influenced the biology of modern humans through both positive and negative selection. Adaptive introgression provided genetic variants that proved beneficial for survival in new environments, including genes related to the immune system (such as HLA alleles), skin and hair morphology, and high-altitude adaptation. Conversely, large regions of the modern human genome, particularly on the X chromosome and in genes expressed in the testes, are devoid of archaic ancestry. This suggests that purifying selection acted to remove deleterious alleles that likely caused reduced fertility in male hybrids.

These findings have resolved long-standing debates in paleoanthropology, shifting the scientific consensus from a strict "Out of Africa" replacement model to one of assimilation. For decades, the prevailing view was that modern humans replaced archaic populations without significant interbreeding, despite some morphological evidence from fossils like the Oase 1 mandible suggesting otherwise. The accumulation of genomic data since 2010 has confirmed that while the majority of modern human ancestry is African in origin, the gene pools of contemporary populations were significantly shaped by ancient hybridization events with archaic hominins across Eurasia and Africa.

== Neanderthals ==
=== Genetics ===
==== Proportion of admixture ====
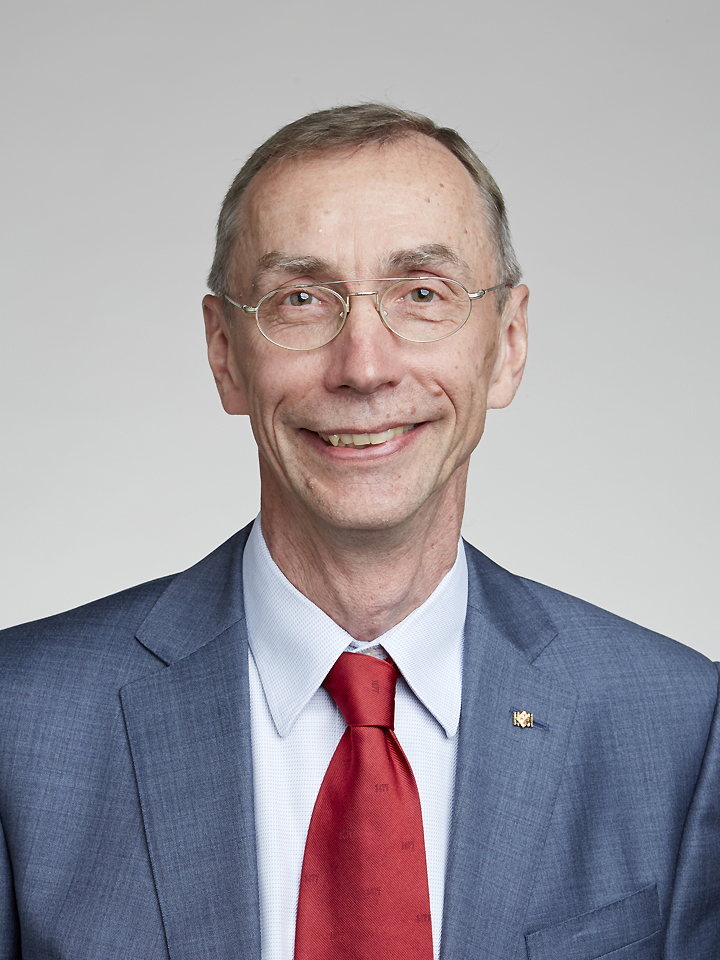
Svante Pääbo, Nobel Prize laureate and one of the researchers who published the first sequence of the Neanderthal genome.

On 7 May 2010, following the genome sequencing of three Vindija Neanderthals, a draft sequence of the Neanderthal genome was published and revealed that Neanderthals shared more alleles with Eurasian populations than with sub-Saharan African populations According to the authors the observed excess of genetic similarity is best explained by recent gene flow from Neanderthals to modern humans after the migration out of Africa. They estimated the proportion of Neanderthal-derived ancestry to be 1–4% of the Eurasian genome. Durand et al. (2011) estimated 1–6% Neanderthal ancestry in non-Africans. Prüfer et al. (2013) estimated the proportion to be 1.5–2.1% for non-Africans. Lohse and Frantz (2014) infer a higher rate of 3.4–7.3% in Eurasia. In 2017, Prüfer et al. revised their estimate to 1.8–2.6% for non-Africans outside Oceania.

According to a later study by Chen et al. (2020), Africans (specifically, the 1000 Genomes African populations) also have Neanderthal admixture, with this Neanderthal admixture in African individuals accounting for 17 megabases, which is 0.3% of their genome. According to the authors, Africans gained their Neanderthal admixture predominantly from a back-migration by peoples (modern humans carrying Neanderthal admixture) that had diverged from ancestral Europeans (postdating the split between East Asians and Europeans). This back-migration is proposed to have happened about 20,000 years ago. However, some scientists, such as geneticist David Reich, have doubts about how extensive the flow of DNA back to Africa would have been, finding the signal of Neanderthal admixture "really weak".

==== Introgressed genome ====
It has been found that 50% of the Neanderthal genome is present among people in India, and 41% has been found in Icelanders. Previously it was found that about 20% of the Neanderthal genome was found in modern Eurasians, but the figure was also estimated at a third. A 2023 study found an introgression from modern humans to Neanderthals around 250,000 years ago, and estimated that roughly 6% of the Altai Neanderthal genome was inherited from modern humans.

==== Subpopulation admixture rate ====
A higher Neanderthal admixture was found in East Asians than in Europeans, which is estimated to be about 20% more introgression into East Asians. This could possibly be explained by the occurrence of further admixture events in the early ancestors of East Asians after the separation of Europeans and East Asians, dilution of Neanderthal ancestry in Europeans by populations with low Neanderthal ancestry from later migrations, or reduced efficacy of purifying selection in the ancestors of East Asians, due to smaller effective population sizes as they migrated to East Asia. Studies simulating admixture models indicate that a reduced efficacy of purifying selection against Neanderthal alleles in East Asians could not account for the greater proportion of Neanderthal ancestry of East Asians, thus favoring more-complex models involving additional pulses of admixture between Neanderthals and the ancestors of East Asians. Such models show a pulse to ancestral Eurasians, followed by separation and an additional pulse to ancestral East Asians. It is observed that there is a small but significant variation of Neanderthal admixture rates within European populations, but no significant variation within East Asian populations. Prüfer et al. (2017) remarked that East Asians carry more Neanderthal DNA (2.3–2.6%) than Western Eurasians (1.8–2.4%).

It was later determined by Chen et al. (2020) that East Asians have 8% more Neanderthal ancestry, revised from the previous reports of 20% more Neanderthal ancestry, compared to Europeans. This stems from the fact that the Neanderthal ancestry they shared with Africans had been masked by a flawed assumption; because Africans were thought to have no Neanderthal admixture, they had been used as reference samples. Thus, any overlap in Neanderthal admixture with Africans resulted in an underestimation of Neanderthal admixture in non-Africans and especially in Europeans. The authors give a single pulse of Neanderthal admixture after the out-of-Africa dispersal as the most parsimonious explanation for the enrichment in East Asians, but they add that variation in Neanderthal ancestry may also be attributed to dilution to account for the now-more-modest differences found. As a proportion of the total amount of Neanderthal sequence for each population, 7.2% of the sequence in Europeans is shared exclusively with Africans, while 2% of the sequence in East Asians is shared exclusively with Africans.

Genomic analysis suggests that there is a global division in Neanderthal introgression between sub-Saharan African populations and other modern human groups (including North Africans) rather than between African and non-African populations. North African groups share a similar excess of derived alleles with Neanderthals as do non-African populations, whereas sub-Saharan African groups are the only modern human populations that generally did not experience Neanderthal admixture. The Neanderthal genetic signal among North African populations was found to vary depending on the relative quantity of North African, European, Near Eastern and sub-Saharan ancestry. Using F4 ancestry ratio statistical analysis, the Neanderthal inferred admixture was observed to be highest among the North African populations with highest North African ancestry such as Tunisian Berbers, where it was at the same level or even higher than that of Eurasian populations (100–138%); high among North African populations carrying greater European or Near Eastern admixture, such as groups in North Morocco and Egypt (~60–70%); and lowest among North African populations with greater Sub-Saharan admixture, such as in South Morocco (20%). Quinto et al. (2012) therefore postulate that the presence of this Neanderthal genetic signal in Africa is not due to recent gene flow from Near Eastern or European populations since it is higher among populations bearing indigenous pre-Neolithic North African ancestry. Low but significant rates of Neanderthal admixture has also been observed for the Maasai of East Africa. After identifying African and non-African ancestry among the Maasai, it can be concluded that recent non-African modern human (post-Neanderthal) gene flow was the source of the contribution since around an estimated 30% of the Maasai genome can be traced to non-African introgression from about 100 generations ago.

Reich states that all present-day non Sub-Saharan Africans have around 2% of Neanderthal ancestry.

==== Distance to lineages ====
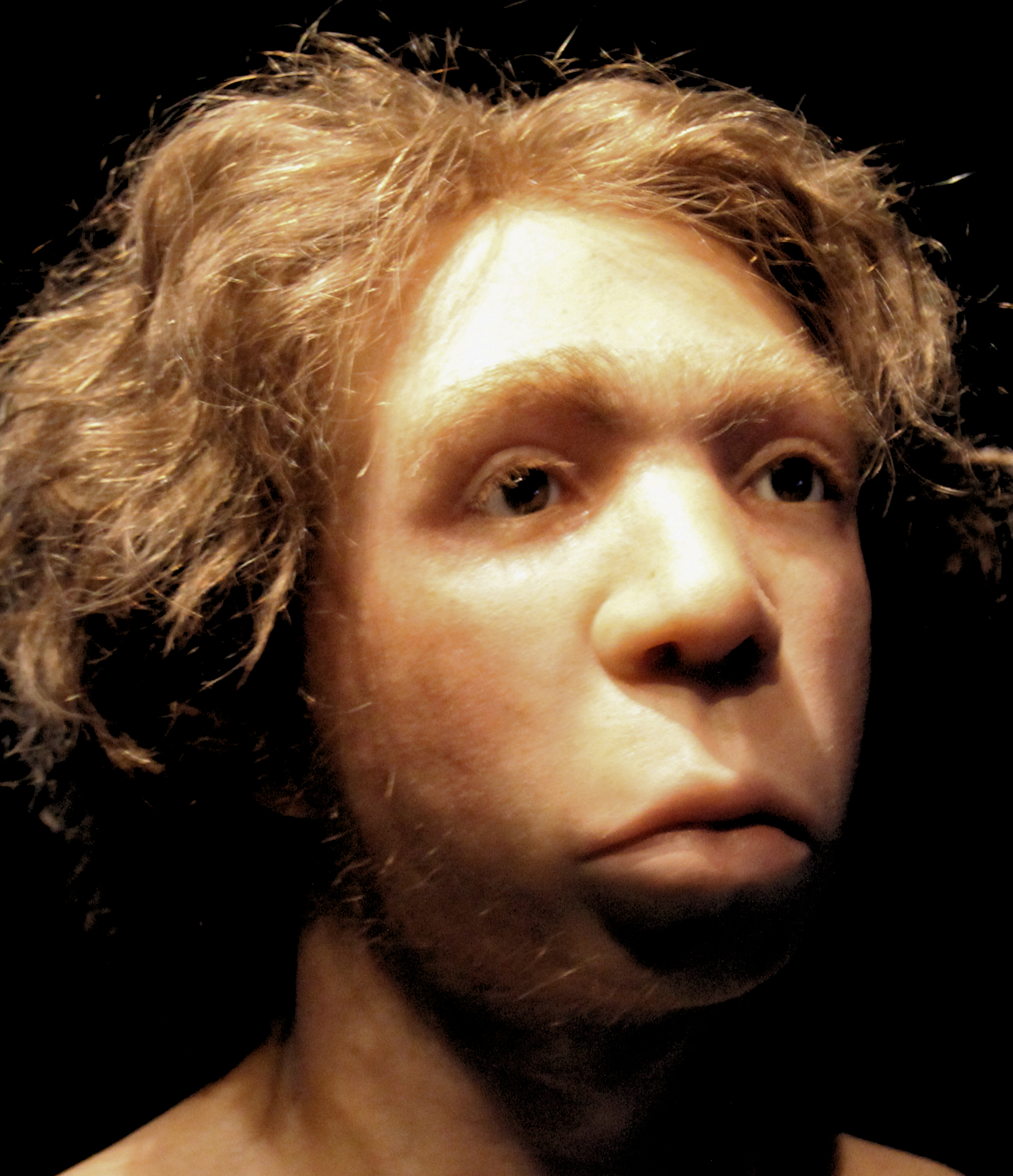
Le Moustier Neanderthal skull reconstitution, Neues Museum Berlin.

Presenting a high-quality genome sequence of a female Altai Neanderthal, it has been found that the Neanderthal component in non-African modern humans is more related to the Mezmaiskaya Neanderthal (North Caucasus) than to the Altai Neanderthal (Siberia) or the Vindija Neanderthals (Croatia). By high-coverage sequencing the genome of a 50,000-year-old female Vindija Neanderthal fragment, it was later found that the Vindija and Mezmaiskaya Neanderthals did not seem to differ in the extent of their allele-sharing with modern humans. In this case, it was also found that the Neanderthal component in non-African modern humans is more closely related to the Vindija and Mezmaiskaya Neanderthals than to the Altai Neanderthal. These results suggest that a majority of the admixture into modern humans came from Neanderthal populations that had diverged (about 80–100kya) from the Vindija and Mezmaiskaya Neanderthal lineages before the latter two diverged from each other.

Analysis of chromosome 21 of the Altai, El Sidrón (Spain), and Vindija Neanderthals indicates that of these three lineages, only the El Sidrón and Vindija Neanderthals display significant rates of gene flow (0.3–2.6%) into modern humans, suggesting that the El Sidrón and Vindija Neanderthals are more closely related than the Altai Neanderthal to the Neanderthals that interbred with modern humans about 47,000–65,000 years ago. Conversely, significant rates of modern human gene flow into Neanderthals occurred—of the three examined lineages—for only the Altai Neanderthal (0.1–2.1%), suggesting that modern human gene flow into Neanderthals mainly took place after the separation of the Altai Neanderthals from the El Sidrón and Vindija Neanderthals that occurred roughly 110,000 years ago. The findings show that the source of modern human gene flow into Neanderthals originated from a population of early modern humans from about 100,000 years ago, predating the out-of-Africa migration of the modern human ancestors of present-day non-Africans.

==== Mitochondrial DNA and Y chromosome ====
No evidence of Neanderthal mitochondrial DNA has been found in modern humans. This suggests that successful Neanderthal admixture happened in pairings with Neanderthal males and modern human females. Possible hypotheses are that Neanderthal mitochondrial DNA had detrimental mutations that led to the extinction of carriers, that the hybrid offspring of Neanderthal mothers were raised in Neanderthal groups and became extinct with them, or that female Neanderthals and male Sapiens did not produce fertile offspring. However, the hypothesized incompatibility between Neanderthals and modern humans is contested by findings that suggest that the Y chromosome of Neanderthals was replaced by an extinct lineage of the modern human Y chromosome, which introgressed into Neanderthals between 100,000 and 370,000 years ago. Furthermore, the study concludes that the replacement of the Y chromosomes and mitochondrial DNA in Neanderthals after gene flow from modern humans is highly plausible given the increased genetic load in Neanderthals relative to modern humans.

As shown in an interbreeding model produced by Neves and Serva (2012), the Neanderthal admixture in modern humans may have been caused by a very low rate of interbreeding between modern humans and Neanderthals, with the exchange of one pair of individuals between the two populations in about every 77 generations. This low rate of interbreeding would account for the absence of Neanderthal mitochondrial DNA from the modern human gene pool as found in earlier studies, as the model estimates a probability of only 7% for a Neanderthal origin of both mitochondrial DNA and Y chromosome in modern humans.

In 2026, a study published in the journal Science analyzing X chromosome data, which indicated that successful interbreeding between Neanderthals and modern humans was predominantly between Neanderthal males and sapiens females, though the authors did not rule out the effects of natural selection. This conclusion was based on a comparative genomic analysis that revealed an excess of modern human DNA in the X chromosomes of Neanderthals and very little Neanderthal inheritance in the X chromosome of modern sapiens. The bias detected could reflect cultural or social differences between the two species, or simply natural selection. The effects were most noticed in an earlier interbreeding event 250,000 years ago, rather than the interbreeding events 50,000 years ago that contributed the majority of Neanderthal DNA. Although it could not be determined whether the encounters were consensual or forced, paleoanthropologist Steven E. Churchill stated that if males of one species monopolised females of the other, it would imply competitive and hostile interactions.

==== Reduced contribution ====
There are large genomic regions with strongly reduced Neanderthal contribution in modern humans due to negative selection, partly caused by hybrid male infertility. These regions were most-pronounced on the X chromosome, with fivefold lower Neanderthal ancestry compared to autosomes. They also contained relatively high numbers of genes specific to testes. This means that modern humans have relatively few Neanderthal genes that are located on the X chromosome or expressed in the testes, suggesting male infertility as a probable cause. It may be partly affected by hemizygosity of X chromosome genes in males.

Deserts of Neanderthal sequences may also be caused by genetic drift involving intense bottlenecks in the modern human population and background selection as a result of strong selection against deleterious Neanderthal alleles. The overlap of many deserts of Neanderthal and Denisovan sequences suggests that repeated loss of archaic DNA occurs at specific loci.

It has also been shown that Neanderthal ancestry has been selected against in conserved biological pathways, such as RNA processing.

Consistent with the hypothesis that purifying selection has reduced Neanderthal contribution in present-day modern human genomes, Upper Paleolithic Eurasian modern humans (such as the Tianyuan modern human) carry more Neanderthal DNA (about 4–5%) than present-day Eurasian modern humans (about 1–2%).

Rates of selection against Neanderthal sequences varied for European and Asian populations.

==== Changes in modern humans ====
Hominin timeline
| ← / Earlier apes; ← / Gorilla split; ← / Chimpanzee split; ← / Earliest bipedal; ← / Earliest sign of Ardipithecus; ← / Earliest sign of Australopithecus; ← / Earliest stone tools; ← / Earliest sign of Homo; ← / Dispersal beyond Africa; ← / Earliest fire / cooking; ← / Earliest rock art; ← / Earliest clothes; ← / Modern humans |
(million years ago)

In Eurasia, modern humans have adaptive sequences introgressed from archaic humans, which provided a source of advantageous genetic variants that are adapted to local environments and a reservoir for additional genetic variation. Adaptive introgression from Neanderthals has targeted genes involved with keratin filaments, sugar metabolism, muscle contraction, body fat distribution, enamel thickness, and oocyte meiosis, as well as brain size and functioning. There are signals of positive selection, as the result of adaptation to diverse habitats, in genes involved with variation in skin pigmentation and hair morphology. In the immune system, introgressed variants have heavily contributed to the diversity of immune genes, of which there is an enrichment of introgressed alleles that suggest a strong positive selection.

Genes affecting keratin were found to have been introgressed from Neanderthals into modern humans (shown in East Asians and Europeans), suggesting that these genes gave a morphological adaptation in skin and hair to modern humans to cope with non-African environments. This is likewise for several genes involved in medical-relevant phenotypes, such as those affecting systemic lupus erythematosus, primary biliary cirrhosis, Crohn's disease, optic disk size, smoking behavior, interleukin 18 levels, and diabetes mellitus type 2.

Researchers found Neanderthal introgression of 18 genes—several of which are related to UV-light adaptation—within the chromosome 3p21.31 region (HYAL region) of East Asians. The introgressive haplotypes were positively selected in only East Asian populations, rising steadily from 45,000 years BP until a sudden increase of growth rate around 5,000 to 3,500 years BP. They occur at very high frequencies among East Asian populations in contrast to other Eurasian populations (e.g. European and South Asian populations). The findings also suggests that this Neanderthal introgression occurred within the ancestral population shared by East Asians and Native Americans.

Evans et al. (2006) had previously suggested that a group of alleles collectively known as haplogroup D of microcephalin, a critical regulatory gene for brain volume, originated from an archaic human population. The results show that haplogroup D introgressed 37,000 years ago (based on the coalescence age of derived D alleles) into modern humans from an archaic human population that separated 1.1 million years ago (based on the separation time between D and non-D alleles), consistent with the period when Neanderthals and modern humans co-existed and diverged respectively. The high frequency of the D haplogroup (70%) suggests that it was positively selected for in modern humans. The distribution of the D allele of microcephalin is high outside Africa but low in sub-Saharan Africa, which further suggests that the admixture event happened in archaic Eurasian populations. This distribution difference between Africa and Eurasia suggests that the D allele originated from Neanderthals according to Lari et al. (2010), but they found that a Neanderthal individual from the Mezzena Rockshelter (Monti Lessini, Italy) was homozygous for an ancestral allele of microcephalin, thus providing no support that Neanderthals contributed the D allele to modern humans and also not excluding the possibility of a Neanderthal origin of the D allele. Green et al. (2010), having analyzed the Vindija Neanderthals, also could not confirm a Neanderthal origin of haplogroup D of the microcephalin gene.

It has been found that HLA-A*02, A*26/*66, B*07, B*51, C*07:02, and C*16:02 of the immune system were contributed from Neanderthals to modern humans. After migrating out of Africa, modern humans encountered and interbred with archaic humans, which was advantageous for modern humans in rapidly restoring HLA diversity and acquiring new HLA variants that are better adapted to local pathogens.

It is found that introgressed Neanderthal genes exhibit cis-regulatory effects in modern humans, contributing to the genomic complexity and phenotype variation of modern humans. Looking at heterozygous individuals (carrying both Neanderthal and modern human versions of a gene), the allele-specific expression of introgressed Neanderthal alleles was found to be significantly lower in the brain and testes relative to other tissues. In the brain, this was most pronounced at the cerebellum and basal ganglia. This downregulation suggests that modern humans and Neanderthals possibly experienced a relative higher rate of divergence in these specific tissues.

Furthermore, correlating the genotypes of introgressed Neanderthal alleles with the expression of nearby genes, it is found that archaic alleles contribute proportionally more to variation in expression than nonarchaic alleles. Neanderthal alleles affect expression of the immune genes OAS1/2/3 and TLR1/6/10, which can be specific to cell type and is influenced by environmental stimuli.

Studying the high-coverage female Vindija Neanderthal genome, Prüfer et al. (2017) identified several Neanderthal-derived gene variants, including those that affect levels of LDL cholesterol and vitamin D, and that influence eating disorders, visceral fat accumulation, rheumatoid arthritis, schizophrenia, as well as responses to antipsychotic drugs.

Examining European modern humans in regards to the Altai Neanderthal genome in high-coverage, results show that Neanderthal admixture is associated with several changes in cranium and underlying brain morphology, suggesting changes in neurological function through Neanderthal-derived genetic variation. Neanderthal admixture is associated with an expansion of the posterolateral area of the modern human skull, extending from the occipital and inferior parietal bones to bilateral temporal locales. In regards to modern human brain morphology, Neanderthal admixture is positively correlated with an increase in sulcal depth for the right intraparietal sulcus and an increase in cortical complexity for the early visual cortex of the left hemisphere. Neanderthal admixture is also positively correlated with an increase in white and gray matter volume localized to the right parietal region adjacent to the right intraparietal sulcus. In the area overlapping the primary visual cortex gyrification in the left hemisphere, Neanderthal admixture is positively correlated with gray matter volume. The results also show evidence for a negative correlation between Neanderthal admixture and white matter volume in the orbitofrontal cortex.

In Papuans, Neanderthal genetic variants are found in highest frequency in genes expressed in the brain, whereas Denisovan DNA has the highest frequency in genes expressed in bones and other tissues.

A Neanderthal allele inherited by modern humans, SNP rs3917862, is associated with hypercoagulability. This can be harmful, but women lacking the allele are 0.1% more likely to die in childbirth.

In December 2023, scientists reported that genes inherited by modern humans from Neanderthals and Denisovans may biologically influence the daily routine of modern humans.

==== Population substructure theory ====
Although less parsimonious than recent gene flow, the observation may have been due to ancient population sub-structure in Africa, causing incomplete genetic homogenization within modern humans when Neanderthals diverged while early ancestors of Eurasians were still more closely related to Neanderthals than those of Africans were to Neanderthals. On the basis of allele frequency spectrum, it was shown that the recent admixture model had the best fit to the results while the ancient population sub-structure model had no fit—demonstrating that the best model was a recent admixture event that was preceded by a bottleneck event among modern humans – thus confirming recent admixture as the most parsimonious and plausible explanation for the observed excess of genetic similarities between modern non-African humans and Neanderthals. On the basis of linkage disequilibrium patterns, a recent admixture event is likewise confirmed by the data. From the extent of linkage disequilibrium, it was estimated that the last Neanderthal gene flow into early ancestors of Europeans occurred 47,000–65,000 years BP. In conjunction with archaeological and fossil evidence, the gene flow is thought likely to have occurred somewhere in Western Eurasia, possibly the Middle East. Through another approach—using one genome each of a Neanderthal, Eurasian, African, and chimpanzee (outgroup), and dividing it into non-recombining short sequence blocks—to estimate genome-wide maximum-likelihood under different models, an ancient population sub-structure in Africa was ruled out and a Neanderthal admixture event was confirmed.

A 2025 study questioned the reliability of some statistical methods, such as the D-statistic, that have been used to infer admixture between Neanderthals and humans. Using simulations the authors showed that a model of ancient population structure and no admixture, is able to reproduce multiple genetic patterns that in the past have been used as evidence for admixture. The authors argued that ignoring population structure in demographic models could lead to the inference of spurious admixture events.

=== Morphology ===
The early Upper Paleolithic burial remains of a modern human child from Abrigo do Lagar Velho (Portugal) features traits that indicate Neanderthal interbreeding with modern humans dispersing into Iberia. Considering the dating of the burial remains (24,500 years BP) and the persistence of Neanderthal traits long after the transitional period from a Neanderthal to a modern human population in Iberia (28,000–30,000 years BP), the child may have been a descendant of an already heavily admixed population.

The remains of an early Upper Paleolithic modern human from Peștera Muierilor (Romania) of 35,000 years BP shows a morphological pattern of European early modern humans, but possesses archaic or Neanderthal features, suggesting European early modern humans interbreeding with Neanderthals. These features include a large interorbital breadth, a relatively flat superciliary arches, a prominent occipital bun, an asymmetrical and shallow mandibular notch shape, a high mandibular coronoid processus, the relative perpendicular mandibular condyle to notch crest position, and a narrow scapular glenoid fossa.

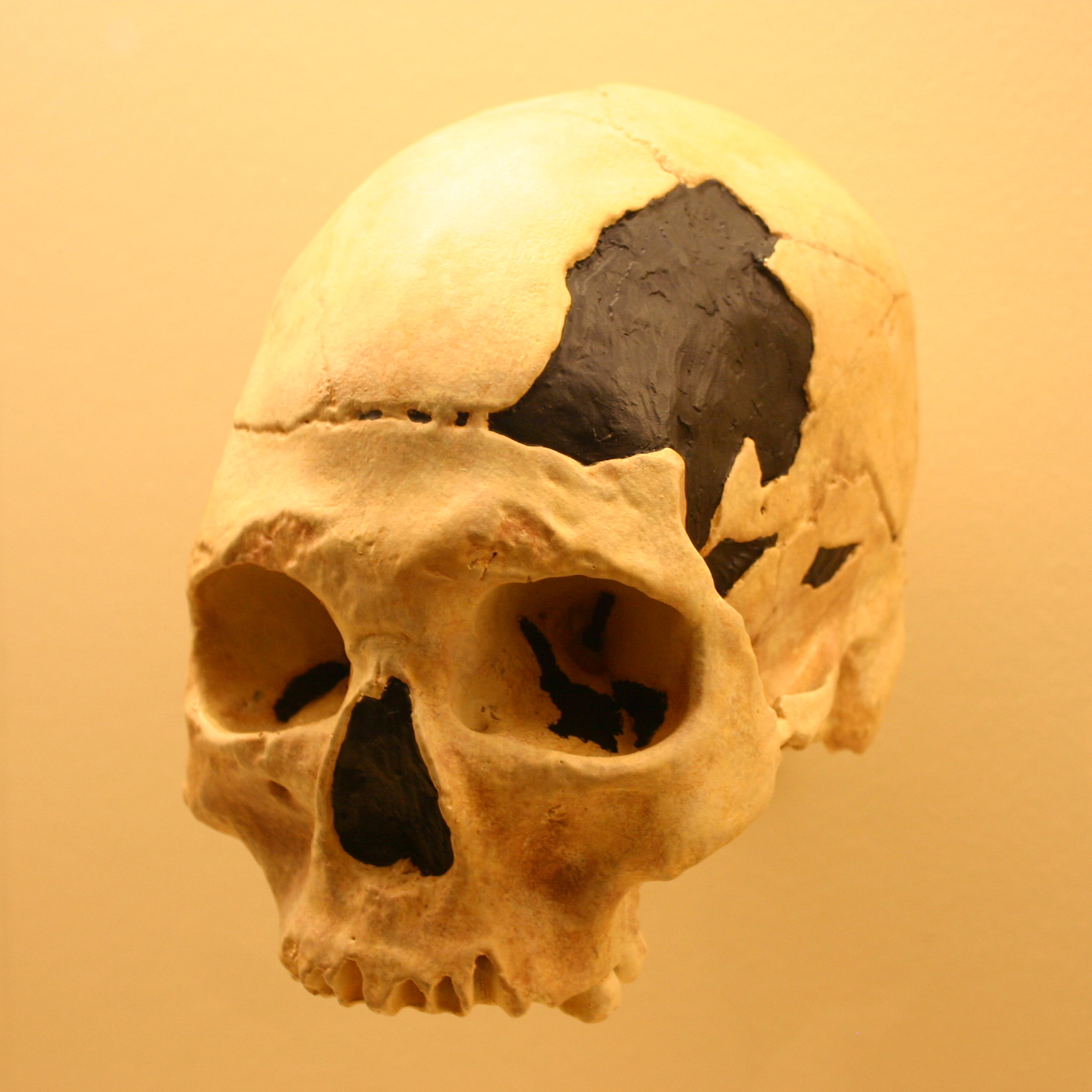
The modern human Oase 2 skull (cast depicted), found in Peştera cu Oase, displays archaic traits due to possible hybridization with Neanderthals.

The early modern human Oase 1 mandible from Peștera cu Oase (Romania) of 34,000–36,000 ^{14}C years BP presents a mosaic of modern, archaic, and possible Neanderthal features. It displays a lingual bridging of the mandibular foramen, not present in earlier humans except Neanderthals of the late Middle and Late Pleistocene, thus suggesting affinity with Neanderthals. Concluding from the Oase 1 mandible, there was apparently a significant craniofacial change of early modern humans from at least Europe, possibly due to some degree of admixture with Neanderthals. The skeleton had up to 9% Neanderthal DNA compared to today's 2% for non sub-Saharan descended humans, which has led David Reich to suggest that natural selection has been removing Neanderthal genes in the time since.

The earliest (before about 33 ka BP) European modern humans and the subsequent (Middle Upper Paleolithic) Gravettians, falling anatomically largely in line with the earliest (Middle Paleolithic) African modern humans, also show traits that are distinctively Neanderthal, suggesting that a solely Middle Paleolithic modern human ancestry was unlikely for European early modern humans.

Manot 1, a partial calvarium of a modern human that was recently discovered at the Manot Cave (Western Galilee, Israel) and dated to 54.7±5.5 kyr BP, represents the first fossil evidence from the period when modern humans successfully migrated out of Africa and colonized Eurasia. It also provides the first fossil evidence that modern humans inhabited the southern Levant during the Middle to Upper Palaeolithic interface, contemporaneously with the Neanderthals and close to the probable interbreeding event. The morphological features suggest that the Manot population may be closely related to or may have given rise to the first modern humans who later successfully colonized Europe to establish early Upper Palaeolithic populations.

=== History ===
The interbreeding has been discussed ever since the discovery of Neanderthal remains in the 19th century, though earlier writers believed that Neanderthals were a direct ancestor of modern humans. Thomas Huxley suggested that many Europeans bore traces of Neanderthal ancestry, but associated Neanderthal characteristics with primitivism, writing that since they "belong to a stage in the development of the human species, antecedent to the differentiation of any of the existing races, we may expect to find them in the lowest of these races, all over the world, and in the early stages of all races".

Until the early 1950s, most scholars thought Neanderthals were not in the ancestry of living humans. Nevertheless, Hans Peder Steensby proposed interbreeding in 1907 in the article Race studies in Denmark. He strongly emphasised that all living humans are of mixed origins. He held that this would best fit observations, and challenged the widespread idea that Neanderthals were ape-like or inferior. Basing his argument primarily on cranial data, he noted that the Danes, like the Frisians and the Dutch, exhibit some Neanderthaloid characteristics, and felt it was reasonable to "assume something was inherited" and that Neanderthals "are among our ancestors".

Carleton Stevens Coon in 1962 found it likely, based upon evidence from cranial data and material culture, that Neanderthal and Upper Paleolithic peoples either interbred or that the newcomers reworked Neanderthal implements "into their own kind of tools".

By the early 2000s, the majority of scholars supported the Out of Africa hypothesis, according to which anatomically modern humans left Africa about 50,000 years ago and replaced Neanderthals with little or no interbreeding. Yet some scholars still argued for hybridisation with Neanderthals. The most vocal proponent of the hybridisation hypothesis was Erik Trinkaus of Washington University in St. Louis. Trinkaus claimed various fossils as products of hybridised populations, including the skeleton of a child found at Lagar Velho in Portugal and the Peștera Muierii skeletons from Romania.

== Denisovans ==
=== Genetics ===
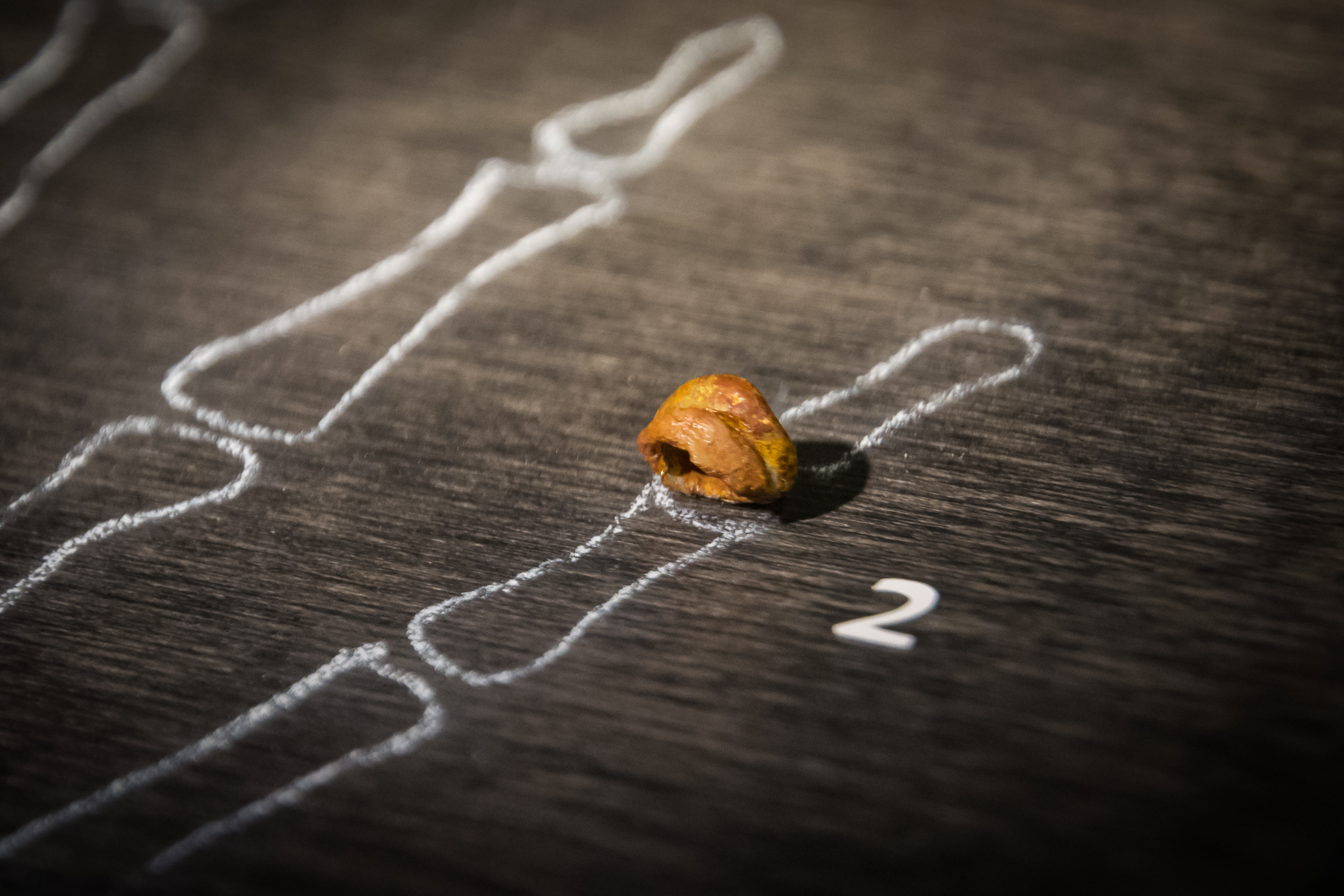
The Denisovan genome was sequenced from a fragment of the distal phalanx of the fifth finger (replica depicted) found in the Denisova cave.

==== Proportion of admixture ====
It has been shown that Melanesians (e.g. Papua New Guinean and Bougainville Islander) share relatively more alleles with Denisovans when compared to other Eurasian-derived populations and Africans. It is estimated that 4% to 6% of the genome in Melanesians derives from Denisovans, while no Eurasians or Africans displayed contributions of the Denisovan genes. It has been observed that Denisovans contributed genes to Melanesians but not to East Asians, indicating that there was interaction between the early ancestors of Melanesians with Denisovans but that this interaction did not take place in the regions near southern Siberia, where as of yet the only Denisovan remains have been found. In addition, Aboriginal Australians also show a relative increased allele sharing with Denisovans, compared to Eurasians and African populations, consistent with the hypothesis of increased admixture between Denisovans and Melanesians.

Reich et al. (2011) observed that Oceanian populations have the highest rates of Denisovan admixture, followed by certain eastern Southeast Asian populations, and none in mainland East Asian populations. They argued that the presence of Denisovan genetic material in eastern Southeast Asian and Oceanian populations (e.g. Aboriginal Australians, Near Oceanians, Polynesians, Fijians, eastern Indonesians, Philippine Mamanwa and Manobo), and absence in western and continental Southeast Asian populations (e.g. western Indonesians, Malaysian Jehai, Andamanese Onge, and mainland Asians), suggests that the Denisovan admixture event may have happened in Southeast Asia itself rather than mainland Eurasia. The observation of high Denisovan admixture in Oceania and the lack thereof in mainland Asia suggests that early modern humans and Denisovans had interbred east of the Wallace Line that divides Southeast Asia, according to Cooper and Stringer (2013).

Skoglund and Jakobsson (2011) observed that particularly Oceanians, followed by Southeast Asians populations, have a high Denisovans admixture relative to other populations. Furthermore, they found possible low traces of Denisovan admixture in East Asians and no Denisovan admixture in Native Americans. In contrast, Prüfer et al. (2013) found that mainland Asian and Native American populations may have a 0.2% Denisovan contribution, which is about twenty-five times lower than Oceanian populations. The manner of gene flow to these populations remains unknown. However, Wall et al. (2013) stated that they found no evidence for Denisovan admixture in East Asians.

Findings indicate that the Denisovan gene flow event happened to the common ancestors of Aboriginal Filipinos, Aboriginal Australians, and New Guineans. New Guineans and Australians have similar rates of Denisovan admixture, indicating that interbreeding took place prior to their common ancestors' entry into Sahul (Pleistocene New Guinea and Australia), at least 44,000 years ago. It has also been observed that the fraction of Near Oceanian ancestry in populations from the Nusa Tenggaras, Moluccas, Polynesia, and Fiji is proportional to their fraction of Denisovan ancestry. An exception is found among in the Philippine Mamanwa and Manobo groups that have higher proportional rates of Denisovan ancestry relative to Near Oceanian ancestry. Reich et al. (2011) suggested a possible model of an early eastward migration wave of modern humans, some who were Philippine/New Guinean/Australian common ancestors that interbred with Denisovans, respectively followed by divergence of the Philippine early ancestors, interbreeding between the New Guinean and Australian early ancestors with a part of the same early-migration population that did not experience Denisovan gene flow, and interbreeding between the Philippine early ancestors with a part of the population from a much-later eastward migration wave (the other part of the migrating population would become East Asians).

Finding components of Denisovan introgression with differing relatedness to the sequenced Denisovan, Browning et al. (2018) suggested that at least two separate episodes of Denisovan admixture has occurred. Specifically, introgression from two distinct Denisovan populations is observed in East Asians (e.g. Japanese and Han Chinese), whereas South Asians (e.g. Telugu and Punjabi) and Oceanians (e.g. Papuans) display introgression from one Denisovan population.

Exploring derived alleles from Denisovans, Sankararaman et al. (2016) estimated that the date of Denisovan admixture was 44,000–54,000 years ago. They also determined that the Denisovan admixture was the greatest in Oceanian populations compared to other populations with observed Denisovan ancestry (i.e. America, Central Asia, East Asia, and South Asia). The researchers also made the surprising finding that South Asian populations display an elevated Denisovan admixture (when compared to other non-Oceanian populations with Denisovan ancestry), albeit the highest estimate (which are found in Sherpas) is still ten times lower than in Papuans. They suggest two possible explanations: There was a single Denisovan introgression event that was followed by dilution to different extents or at least three distinct pulses of Denisovan introgressions must have occurred.

A study in 2021 analyzing archaic ancestry in 118 Philippine ethnic groups discovered an independent admixture event into Philippine Negritos from Denisovans. The Ayta Magbukon in particular were found to possess the highest level of Denisovan ancestry in the world, with ~30%–40% more than even that found in Australians and Papuans (Australo-Melanesians), suggesting that distinct Islander Denisovan populations existed in the Philippines which admixed with modern humans after their arrival.

It has been shown that Eurasians have some but significantly lesser archaic-derived genetic material that overlaps with Denisovans, stemming from the fact that Denisovans are related to Neanderthals—who contributed to the Eurasian gene pool—rather than from interbreeding of Denisovans with the early ancestors of those Eurasians.

The skeletal remains of an early modern human from the Tianyuan cave (near Zhoukoudian, China) of 40,000 years BP showed a Neanderthal contribution within the range of today's Eurasian modern humans, but it had no discernible Denisovan contribution. It is a distant relative to the ancestors of many Asian and Native American populations, but post-dated the divergence between Asians and Europeans. The lack of a Denisovan component in the Tianyuan individual suggests that the genetic contribution had been always scarce in the mainland.

==== Reduced contribution ====
There are large genomic regions devoid of Denisovan-derived ancestry, partly explained by infertility of male hybrids, as suggested by the lower proportion of Denisovan-derived ancestry on X chromosomes and in genes that are expressed in the testes of modern humans.

==== Changes in modern humans ====
Exploring the immune system's HLA alleles, it has been suggested that HLA-B*73 introgressed from Denisovans into modern humans in western Asia due to the distribution pattern and divergence of HLA-B*73 from other HLA alleles. Even though HLA-B*73 is not present in the sequenced Denisovan genome, HLA-B*73 was shown to be closely associated to the Denisovan-derived HLA-C*15:05 from the linkage disequilibrium. From phylogenetic analysis, however, it has been concluded that it is highly likely that HLA-B*73 was ancestral.

The Denisovan's two HLA-A (A*02 and A*11) and two HLA-C (C*15 and C*12:02) allotypes correspond to common alleles in modern humans, whereas one of the Denisovan's HLA-B allotype corresponds to a rare recombinant allele and the other is absent in modern humans. It is thought that these must have been contributed from Denisovans to modern humans, because it is unlikely to have been preserved independently in both for so long due to HLA alleles' high mutation rate.

Tibetan people received an advantageous EGLN1 and EPAS1 gene variant, associated with hemoglobin concentration and response to hypoxia, for life at high altitudes from the Denisovans. The ancestral variant of EPAS1 upregulates hemoglobin levels to compensate for low oxygen levels—such as at high altitudes—but this also has the maladaptation of increasing blood viscosity. The Denisovan-derived variant on the other hand limits this increase of hemoglobin levels, thus resulting in a better altitude adaption. The Denisovan-derived EPAS1 gene variant is common in Tibetans and was positively selected in their ancestors after they colonized the Tibetan plateau.

== Archaic African hominins ==
Rapid decay of fossils in Sub-Saharan African environments makes it currently unfeasible to compare modern human admixture with reference samples of archaic Sub-Saharan African hominins.

Ancient DNA Data from a ~4,500 BP Ethiopian highland individual, and from Southern (~2,300–1,300 BP), and Eastern and South-Central Africa (~8,100–400 BP) has clarified that some West Africa populations have small amounts of excess alleles best explained by an archaic source in West Africans that is not included in the pre-agricultural Eastern African hunter-gatherers, Southern African hunter-gatherer populations, or the genetic gradation between them. The West African groups carrying the archaic DNA include Yoruba from coastal Nigeria and Mende from Sierra Leone indicating that the ancient DNA was acquired long before the spread of agriculture and likely well before the Holocene (starting 11,600 BP), Such an archaic lineage must have separated before the divergence of San ancestors, which is estimated to have begun on the order of 200–300 thousand years ago.

The hypothesis that there has been archaic line in the ancestry of present-day Africans that originated before the San, Pygmies and East African hunter gatherers (and the Eurasians) is supported by a line of evidence independent from the Skoglund findings based on long haplotypes with deep divergences from other human haplotypes including Lachance et al.(2012), Hammer et al. (2011), and Plagnol and Wall (2006).

In the archaic DNA differences found by Hammer, et al., the pygmies (of Central Africa) are grouped with the San (of Southern Africa) in contrast to the Yoruba (of West Africa). Further clarification of the presence of archaic DNA in current West African populations with the extraction and sequencing of DNA from 4 fossils found at Shum Laka in Cameroon dating from 8,000 to 3,000 BP. These individuals were found to derive most of their DNA from Central African hunter gatherers (Pygmy ancestors) and did not share the archaic DNA found in the Yoruba and Mande. The pattern of differences between Eastern, Central and Southern hunter gatherers when compared to the West African groups which had been found by Hammer was confirmed. In a second study Lipson et al. (2020) studied DNA extracted from 6 additional Eastern and Southcentral African fossils from the last 18,000 years. It was determined that their genetic origins could be accounted for by DNA contributions from Southern, Central and Eastern hunter gatherers, and that none of them had the archaic DNA found in the Yoruba.

According to a study published in 2020, there are indications that 2% to 19% (or about ≃6.6 and ≃7.0%) of the DNA of four West African populations may have come from an unknown archaic hominin which split from the ancestor of humans and Neanderthals between 360 kya to 1.02 mya. However, in contrast to the studies of Skoglund and Lipson with ancient African DNA, the study also finds that at least part of this proposed archaic admixture is also present in Eurasians/non-Africans, and that the admixture event or events range from 0 to 124 ka B.P, which includes the period before the Out-of-Africa migration and prior to the African/Eurasian split (thus affecting in part the common ancestors of both Africans and Eurasians/non-Africans). Another recent study, which discovered substantial amounts of previously undescribed human genetic variation, also found ancestral genetic variation in Africans that predates modern humans and was lost in most non-Africans.

== Archaic hominins in Eurasia ==
Hominins' presence in Eurasia began at least 2 million years BP. Genetic evidence shows that thousands of years later when lineages of Neandertals and Denisovans started to expand into Eurasia, the continent was still inhabited by descendants of these archaic hominins, and their genetic admixture made its way into the genome of Neanderthals and Denisovans and later indirectly into modern humans.

Genetic studies show two major events of genetic admixture from superarchaics, suggesting that in the late middle Pleistocene, Eurasia was inhabited by at least two separate populations of ancient hominins.

Roger et al. (2020) describes an event of admixture that occurred soon after Neandersovans (common ancestor of Neanderthals and Denisovans) started to expand into Eurasia. They met a lineage of superarchaic hominins that had been separated from African homo lineages since at least 2 Ma ago.

Previous studies identified more recent event of admixture. About 350,000 years ago a genome of an "erectus-like" hominid was injected into the Denisovan lineage. With the separation time of about 2 Ma ago and interbreeding that happened 350 ka ago, the two populations involved were more distantly related than any pair of human populations previously known to interbreed.

== Related studies ==
In 2019, scientists analyzing genetics using artificial intelligence claimed to find indications of an unknown human ancestor species – not Neanderthal or Denisovan – in the genome of modern humans.

== See also ==
- Multiregional origin of modern humans
- Neanderthal extinction
- Hybrid speciation
- Quest for Fire
