= Oldest sites =

Oldest sites and similar terms may refer to the following:

== Computing ==
- Oldest domain names, the oldest domain names registered in the Internet's Domain Name System
- Oldest websites, the oldest websites on the World Wide Web

== History and archeology ==
- Oldest buildings, the oldest extant buildings in various locations
- Oldest cities, the oldest cities in different parts of the world
- Oldest human settlements, the archeological sites identified as having been populated by anatomically modern humans or archaic hominins

== See also ==
- List of Stone Age art
- Timeline of prehistory
- Category:Lists of ancient buildings and structures
- Category:Lists of oldest buildings and structures
- Category:Oldest things
