= EPAS1 =

Protein found in humans

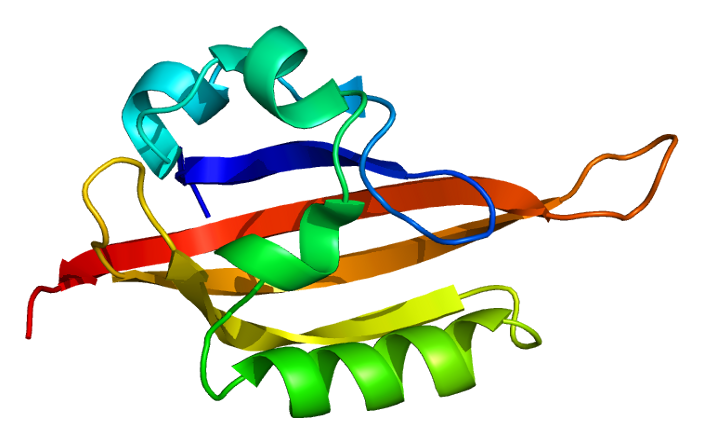

Identifiers
- Aliases: EPAS1, ECYT4, HIF2A, HLF, MOP2, PASD2, bHLHe73, endothelial PAS domain protein 1, Hypoxia-inducible factor-2alpha
- External IDs: OMIM: 603349; MGI: 109169; GeneCards: EPAS1
Available structures
PDB	Ortholog search: PDBe RCSB
PDB	List of PDB id codes 1P97, 2A24, 3F1N, 3F1O, 3F1P, 3H7W, 3H82, 4GHI, 4GS9, 4PKY, 4XT2

Gene location (Human)
Chr.	Chromosome 2 (human)
Band	2p21	Start	46,293,667 bp
Band	2p21	End	46,386,697 bp

Gene location (Mouse)
Chr.	Chromosome 17 (mouse)
Band	17|17 E4	Start	87,061,128 bp
Band	17|17 E4	End	87,140,838 bp
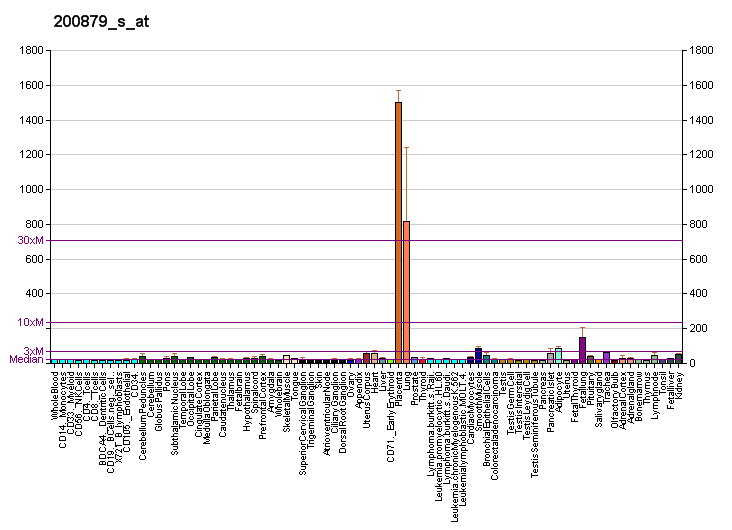
RNA expression pattern
Bgee	Human / Mouse (ortholog); Top expressed in: right lung; lower lobe of lung; nasal epithelium; placenta; visceral pleura; upper lobe of lung; upper lobe of left lung; saphenous vein; superficial temporal artery; pericardium / Top expressed in: right lung lobe; gastrula; Vasculature of brain; retinal pigment epithelium; carotid body; decidua; left lung lobe; ciliary body; Epithelium of choroid plexus; digastric muscle; More reference expression data
BioGPS	More reference expression data
Gene ontology
Molecular function	DNA binding; sequence-specific DNA binding; protein dimerization activity; DNA-binding transcription factor activity; DNA-binding transcription activator activity, RNA polymerase II-specific; transcription factor binding; protein binding; histone acetyltransferase binding; protein heterodimerization activity; DNA-binding transcription factor activity, RNA polymerase II-specific
Cellular component	cytoplasm; cytosol; nuclear speck; transcription regulator complex; nucleoplasm; nucleus
Biological process	surfactant homeostasis; cell differentiation; response to hypoxia; regulation of transcription, DNA-templated; regulation of transcription from RNA polymerase II promoter in response to oxidative stress; lung development; norepinephrine metabolic process; iron ion homeostasis; mitochondrion organization; embryonic placenta development; cell maturation; response to oxidative stress; transcription, DNA-templated; regulation of heart rate; multicellular organism development; blood vessel remodeling; myoblast fate commitment; angiogenesis; regulation of transcription from RNA polymerase II promoter in response to hypoxia; erythrocyte differentiation; signal transduction; visual perception; positive regulation of transcription by RNA polymerase II; cellular response to hypoxia; transcription by RNA polymerase II; post-translational protein modification; hemopoiesis; regulation of transcription by RNA polymerase II; positive regulation of cold-induced thermogenesis; protein ubiquitination
Sources:Amigo / QuickGO
Orthologs
Databases	NCBI: entry; OMA: entry
Species	Human	Mouse
Entrez	2034	13819
Ensembl	ENSG00000116016	ENSMUSG00000024140
UniProt	Q99814	P97481
RefSeq (mRNA)	NM_001430	NM_010137
RefSeq (protein)	NP_001421	NP_034267
Location (UCSC)	Chr 2: 46.29 – 46.39 Mb	Chr 17: 87.06 – 87.14 Mb
PubMed search
- Wikidata
View/Edit Human	View/Edit Mouse

Endothelial PAS domain-containing protein 1 (EPAS1, also known as hypoxia-inducible factor-2alpha (HIF-2α)) is a protein that is encoded by the EPAS1 gene in mammals. It is a type of hypoxia-inducible factor, a group of transcription factors involved in the physiological response to oxygen concentration. The gene is active under hypoxic conditions. It is also important in the development of the heart, and for maintaining the catecholamine balance required for protection of the heart. Mutation often leads to neuroendocrine tumors.

However, several characterized alleles of EPAS1 contribute to high-altitude adaptation in humans. One such allele, which has been inherited from Denisovan archaic hominins, is known to confer increased athletic performance in some people, and has therefore been referred to as the "super athlete gene".

== Function ==
The EPAS1 gene encodes one subunit of a transcription factor involved in the induction of genes regulated by oxygen, and which is induced as oxygen concentration falls (hypoxia). The protein contains a basic helix–loop–helix protein dimerization domain as well as a domain found in signal transduction proteins which respond to oxygen levels. EPAS1 is involved in the development of the embryonic heart and is expressed in endothelial cells that line the walls of blood vessels in the umbilical cord.

EPAS1 is also essential for the maintenance of catecholamine homeostasis and protection against heart failure during early embryonic development. Catecholamines regulated by EPAS1 include epinephrine and norepinephrine. It is critical that the production of catecholamines remain in homeostatic conditions so that both the delicate fetal heart and the adult heart do not overexert themselves and induce heart failure. Catecholamine production in the embryo is related to control of cardiac output by increasing the fetal heart rate.

== Alleles ==
A high percentage of Tibetans carry an allele of EPAS1 that improves oxygen transport. The beneficial allele is also found in the extinct Denisovan genome, suggesting that it arose in them and entered the modern human population through hybridization.

The Himalayan wolf and the Tibetan Mastiff have inherited an altitude-adaptive allele of the gene from interbreeding with a ghost population of an unknown wolf-like canid. The EPAS1 allele is known to confer an adaptive advantage to animals living at high-altitudes.

== Clinical significance ==
Mutations in the EPAS1 gene are related to early-onset neuroendocrine tumors such as paragangliomas, somatostatinomas and/or pheochromocytomas. The mutations are commonly somatic missense mutations that locate in the primary hydroxylation site of HIF-2α, which disrupt the protein hydroxylation/degradation mechanism, and leads to protein stabilization and pseudohypoxic signaling. In addition, these neuroendocrine tumors release erythropoietin (EPO) into circulating blood, and lead to polycythemia.

Mutations in this gene are associated with erythrocytosis familial type 4, pulmonary hypertension, and chronic mountain sickness. There is also evidence that certain variants of this gene provide protection for people living at high altitude such as in Tibet. The effect is most profound among the Tibetans living in the Himalayas at an altitude of about 4,000 metres above sea level, the environment of which is intolerable to other human populations due to 40% less atmospheric oxygen.

A study by UC Berkeley identified more than 30 genetic factors that make Tibetans' bodies well-suited for high-altitudes, including EPAS1. Tibetans suffer no health problems associated with altitude sickness, but instead produce low levels of blood pigment (haemoglobin) sufficient for less oxygen, more elaborate blood vessels, have lower infant mortality, and are heavier at birth.

EPAS1 is useful in high altitudes as a short term adaptive response. However, EPAS1 can also cause excessive production of red blood cells leading to chronic mountain sickness that can lead to death and inhibited reproductive abilities. Some mutations that increase its expression are associated with increased hypertension and stroke at low altitude, with symptoms similar to mountain sickness. Populations living permanently at high altitudes experience selection on EPAS1 for mutations which reduce the negative fitness consequences of excessive red blood cell production.

Belzutifan is a HIF-2α inhibitor, a medication approved in United States, United Kingdom, and European Union.

Casdatifan is another HIF-2α inhibitor that is currently undergoing phase 3 clinical trials for advanced clear cell renal cell carcinoma.

== Interactions ==
EPAS1 has been shown to interact with aryl hydrocarbon receptor nuclear translocator and ARNTL.
