= Casdatifan =

Clinical data
- Other names: AB-521

Identifiers
- IUPAC name: (5R,6S,8R)-3,5,6-Trifluoro-8-[(1S,2R)-2-fluoro-1-hydroxy-7-methylsulfonyl-2,3-dihydro-1H-inden-4-yl]-5,6,7,8-tetrahydronaphthalene-1-carbonitrile
- CAS Number: 2709069-30-5
- PubChem CID: 156859185
- IUPHAR/BPS: 13981
- DrugBank: DB21701
- UNII: DP73UWL6LE
- KEGG: D13257
- ChEBI: CHEBI:760136
- ChEMBL: ChEMBL6068220

Chemical and physical data
- Formula: C_{21}H_{17}F_{4}NO_{3}S
- Molar mass: 439.42 g·mol^{−1}
- 3D model (JSmol): Interactive image
- SMILES: CS(=O)(=O)C1=C2[C@@H]([C@@H](CC2=C(C=C1)[C@H]3C[C@@H]([C@@H](C4=CC(=CC(=C34)C#N)F)F)F)F)O
- InChI: InChI=1S/C21H17F4NO3S/c1-30(28,29)17-3-2-11(13-7-16(24)21(27)19(13)17)12-6-15(23)20(25)14-5-10(22)4-9(8-26)18(12)14/h2-5,12,15-16,20-21,27H,6-7H2,1H3/t12-,15+,16-,20-,21-/m1/s1; Key:KHBHHNNBNHHGPE-QCCZFBHPSA-N

Casdatifan is an investigational new drug that is being evaluated by Arcus Biosciences and AstraZeneca for the treatment of renal cell carcinoma. It is an inhibitor of endothelial PAS domain-containing protein 1 (HIF‑2α).

== Pharmacology ==
Casdatifan is allosteric HIF‑2α inhibitor with low-nanomolar potency in cell-based reporter assays.

== Clinical trials ==
Casdatifan in combination with cabozantinib (a tyrosine-kinase inhibitor) is currently in phase 3 clinical trials for the treatment of advanced clear cell renal cell carcinoma.
