= Lagar Velho 1 =

Complete prehistorical skeleton found in Portugal

Lagar Velho 1, also known as the Lagar Velho boy or Lapedo child, is a complete prehistorical skeleton found in Portugal, believed to be from a hybrid population of Neanderthals and anatomically modern humans.

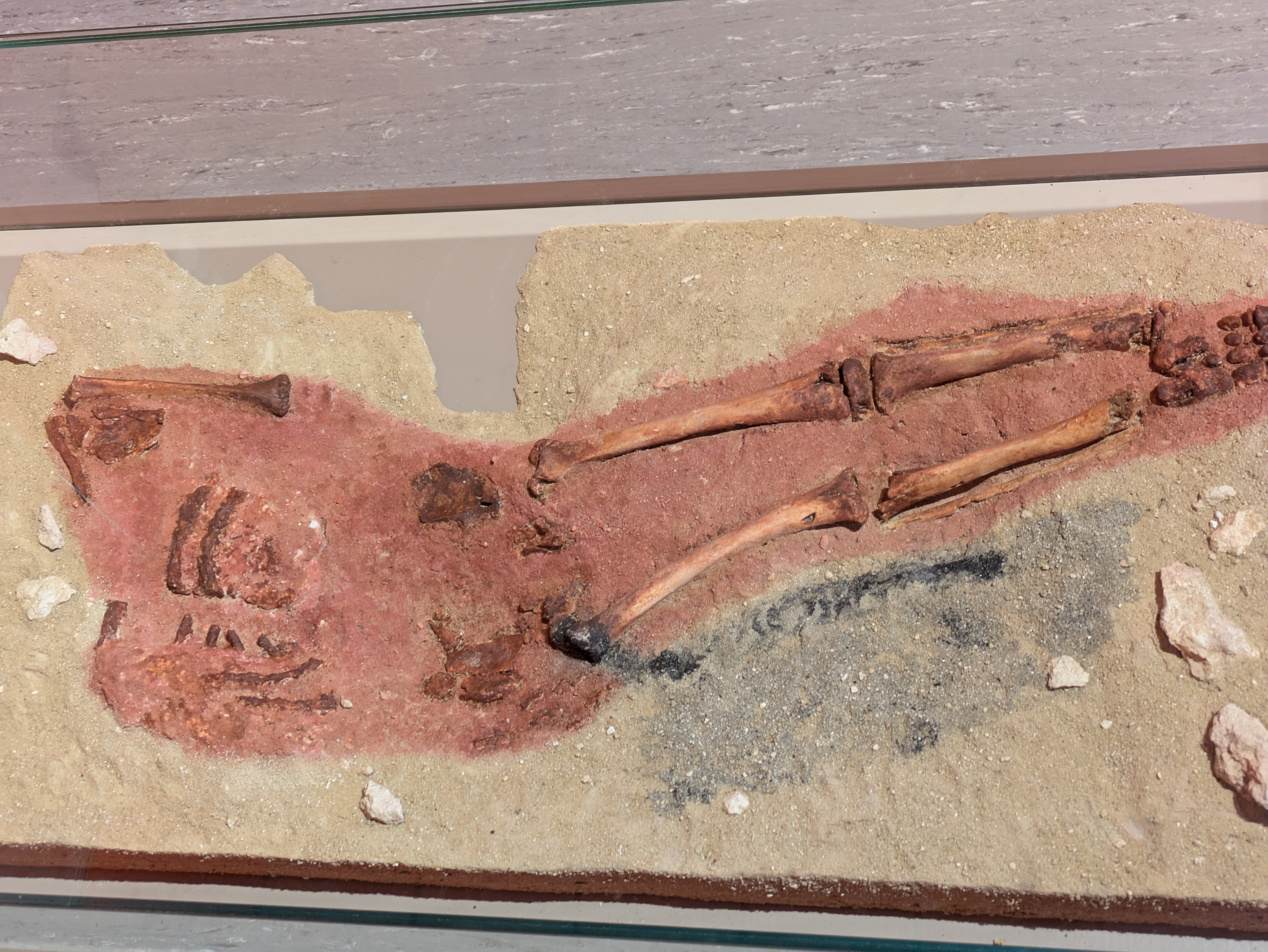
Reconstruction of the Lapedo Child

In 1998, the discovery of an early Upper Paleolithic human burial at Abrigo do Lagar Velho by a team led by prehistoric archeologist João Zilhão provided evidence of early modern humans from the west of the Iberian Peninsula. The remains, the largely complete skeleton of an approximately 4-year-old child, buried with pierced shell and red ochre, are dated to about 24,500 years BP. The cranium, mandible, dentition, and rest of the skeleton present a mosaic of European early modern human and Neanderthal features. This morphological mosaic may indicate admixture between late archaic and early modern humans in Iberia, contradicting hypotheses of complete replacement of the Neanderthals by early modern humans, and underlining the complexities of the cultural and biological processes and events that were involved in the emergence of modern humans.

The suggestion of hybridisation was contested by several scientists, including Prof. Dr. C. P. E. Zollikofer of the University of Zurich, who concluded that the skeleton does not reveal Neanderthal affinities. However, genetic work from a decade later has shown that there has indeed been instances of admixture between Neanderthals and modern humans, bringing the hybrid hypothesis back within the realm of possibility.
