= Oasl2 =

2'-5' oligoadenylate synthetase-like 2 is a protein that in the house mouse is encoded by the Oasl2 gene. The gene is also known as Oasl, M1204 and Mmu-OASL. Oasl2 is a paralogue of Oasl1.
