= Abrigo do Lagar Velho =

Cave and archaeological site in Portugal

Rock shelter of Lagar Velho
- Abrigo do Lagar Velho (Portuguese)
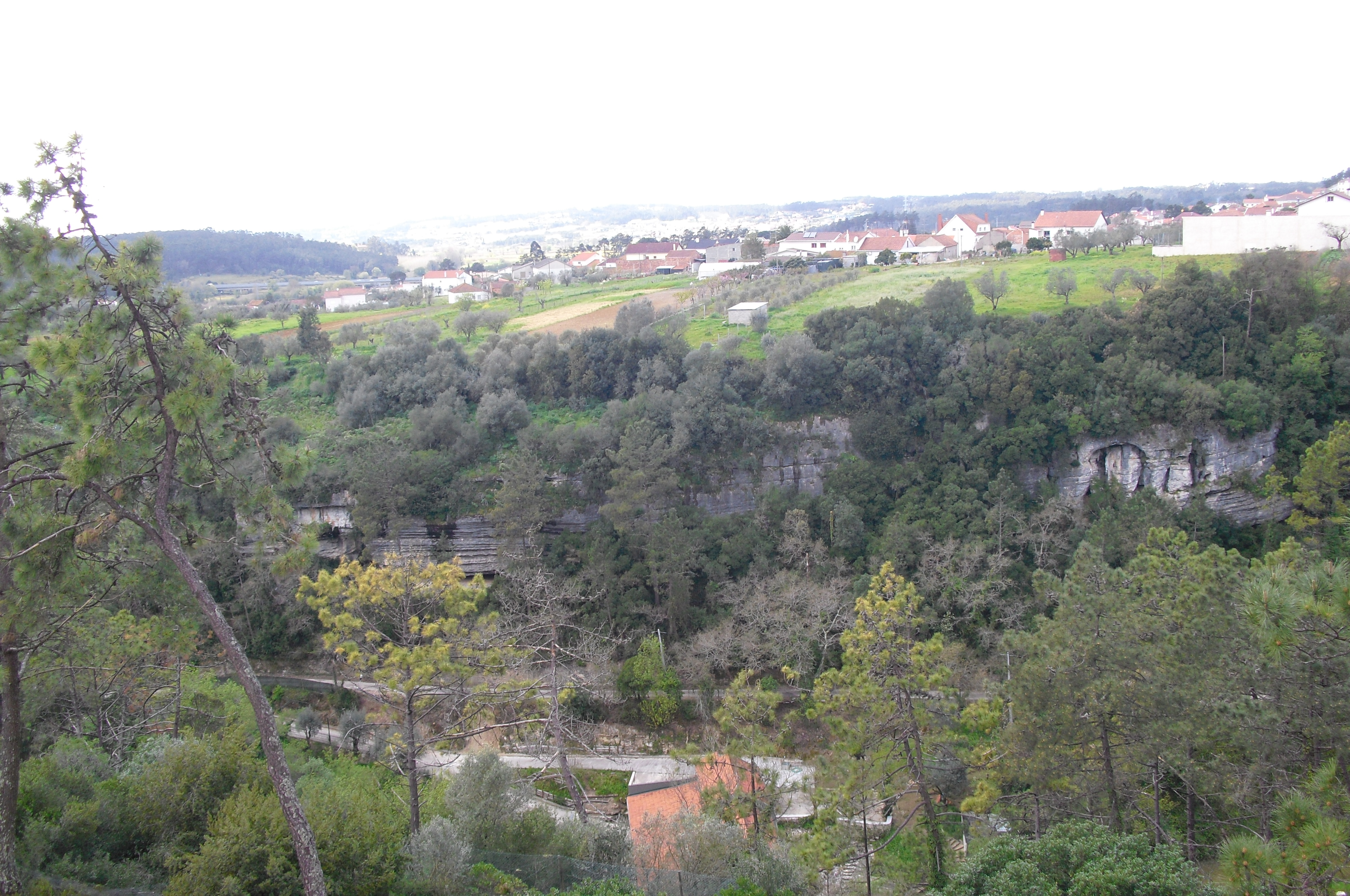
- Karst topography in the Valley of Lapedo, location of the shelter of Lagar Velho
- Interactive map of Rock shelter of Lagar Velho
- 39°45′19.41″N 8°44′6.92″W
- Periods: Paleolithic
- Location: Vale do Lapedo, Santa Eufémia, Leiria, Portugal

Site notes
- Material: Karst
- Length: 22.18 m (72.8 ft)
- Width: 8.39 m (27.5 ft)
- Owner: Portuguese Republic
- Management: Instituto Gestão do Patrimonio Arquitectónico e Arqueológico
- Public access: Yes

Lagar Velho is a rock shelter in the Lapedo valley, a limestone canyon 13 km from the centre of Leiria, in the municipality of Leiria, in central Portugal. The site is known for the discovery of a 24,000-year-old Cro-Magnon child, later referred to as the Lapedo child. The skeleton is classified as a National Treasure.

== Geography ==
Situated between the civil parishes of Caranguejeira and Santa Eufémia, near Leiria, in the central western region of Portugal, the Valley of Lapedo (Portuguese: Vale do Lapedo) is formed by the waters of the Ribeira de Caranguejeira. It is an area of natural diversity of flora and fauna, that includes Carrion Crows (Corvus corone), eagles and field rats, in addition to Black, European or Common Alder (Alnus glutinosa), Willow (genus Salix), European or Common Ash (Fraxinus excelsior), Populus (family Salicaceae) and Vitis grapevines (of the family Vitaceae).

== History ==
In archaeological terms, the site is known to integrate a stratigraphic sequence representative of much of the Upper Paleolithic human occupations of the region (between about 30,000 and 20,000 years), gathering at various levels respective traces and carved lithic remnants, associated with coeval faunal elements. The site consists of deposits within horizontal fissures, at the base of a limestone cliff, located on the south flank of the Lapedo Valley.

The site was initially damaged by earth removal in 1992, that exposed an Upper Paleolithic sequence, that came within centimeters of the burial. On 28 November 1998, the site was discovered by João Zilhão and was excavated by him together with Cidália Duarte, and Erik Trinkaus from the US, who was consulted because of his experience with Paleolithic remains. The left hand and forearm of a child were initially found and in the following weeks the presence of Paleolithic deposits and the human burial were confirmed. Excavation were carried out between 12 December 1998 and 7 January (with pathological analysis beginning on 4 January 1999). The report issued by Duarte et al in 1999 was the first reported discovery of evidence of genetic mixing of Homo Sapiens and Neanderthals.

In February 2022, part of the rock wall was damaged by vandals. Five hundred osteological fragments and lithic were scattered on the ground. Holes, possibly made with a stick, were found and erosion was ruled out as a cause. The culprits were not identified.

== Significance ==
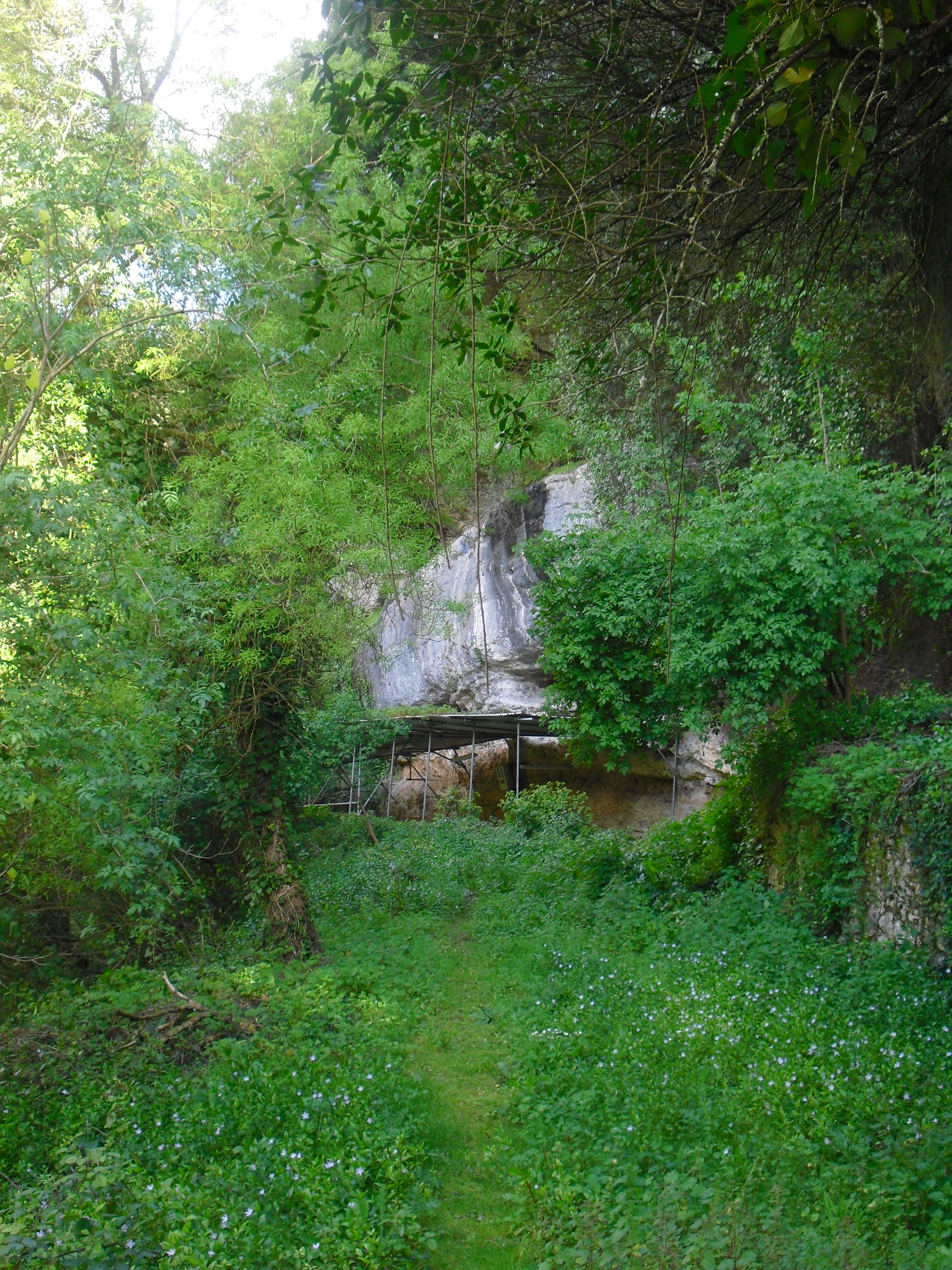
The shelter of Lagar Velho, within the limestone valley of Lapedo

The discovery of an early Upper Paleolithic human burial site in the valley provided evidence of early modern humans in southern Iberia. The remains, the largely complete skeleton of an approximately 4-year-old child, was buried with a pierced shell and red ochre (initially dated to circa 24,500 years B.P.). In 2025, compound-specific radiocarbon dating using hydroxyproline put the bones at between 27,800 and 28,600 years ago. The cranium, mandible, dentition, and postcrania appear to present a mosaic of European early modern human and Neanderthal features. If the child was indeed a hybrid of anatomically modern humans and Homo neanderthalensis, there could be significant implications regarding the Neanderthal interaction with Cro-Magnons and the taxonomical classification of these (possibly sub-) species. This apparent hybridization attracted a great deal of attention, with some people, including some archaeologists, not accepting that Homo sapiens had been crossed with another species. There was no suggestion that the child had had parents of different species, but rather that there had been widespread mixing over a long period. Despite criticism, the archaeologists persisted, publishing their work and evidence. Over time, the evidence came to be generally accepted and improvements to gene sequencing proved that there had been mixing of Neanderthal and Homo sapiens genes.

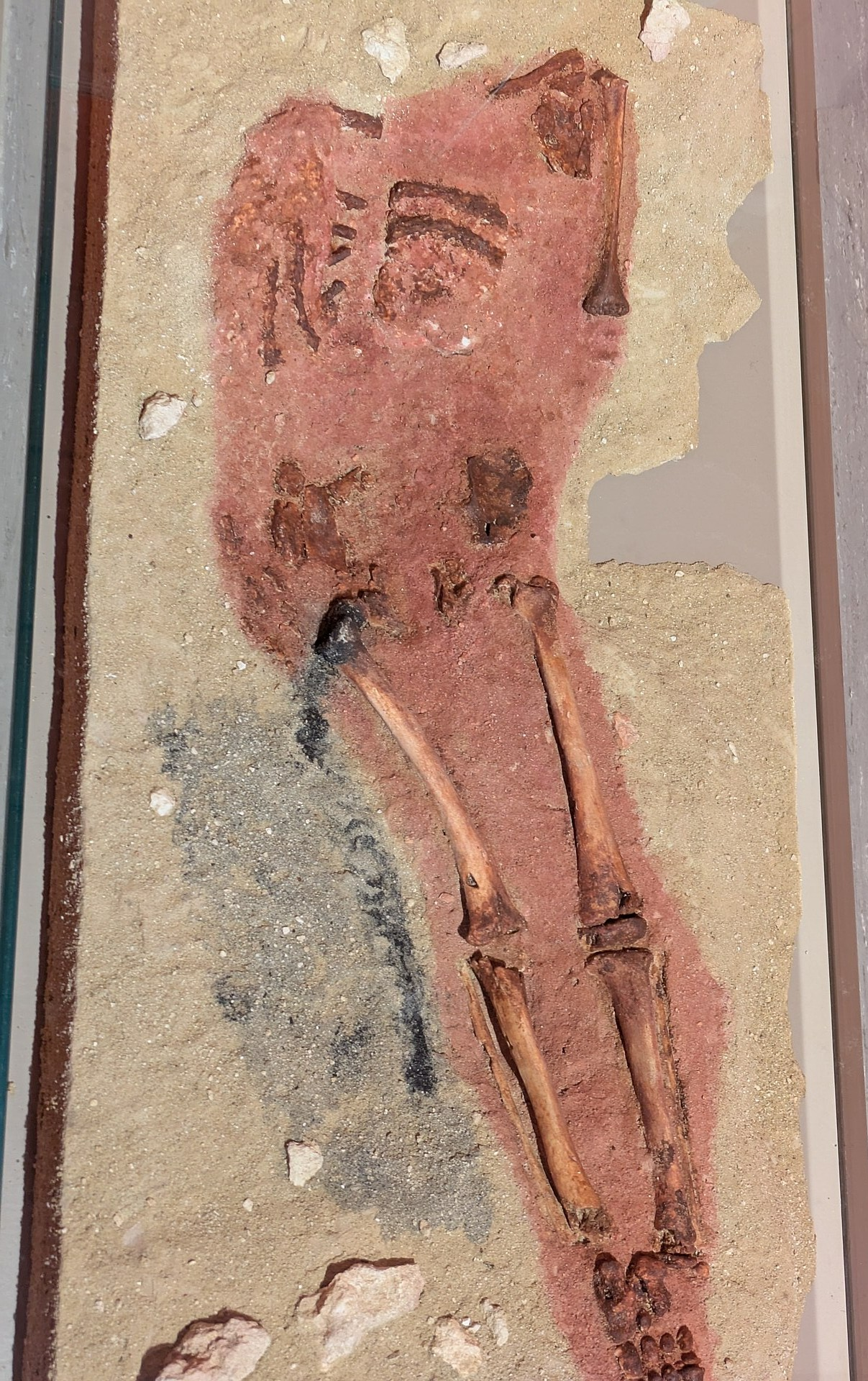
Reconstruction of the Lapedo Child

In addition to the burial context, recent archaeological campaigns have uncovered various levels of a Gravettian habitat, identifying an excellent state of preservation and original spatial organization.

== Exhibition ==
There were plans for the skeletal remains to be kept in the Museum of Leiria, housed in the Convent of Santo Agostinho (Portuguese: Convento de Santo Agostinho). As of 2026 the remains were held by the National Museum of Archaeology, Lisbon, which was undergoing restoration. A replica of the skeleton can be seen at the Interpretation Centre of Abrigo do Lagar Velho, not far from the cave in which it was found.
