= 2'-5'-oligoadenylate synthase =

2'-5'-oligoadenylate synthetase
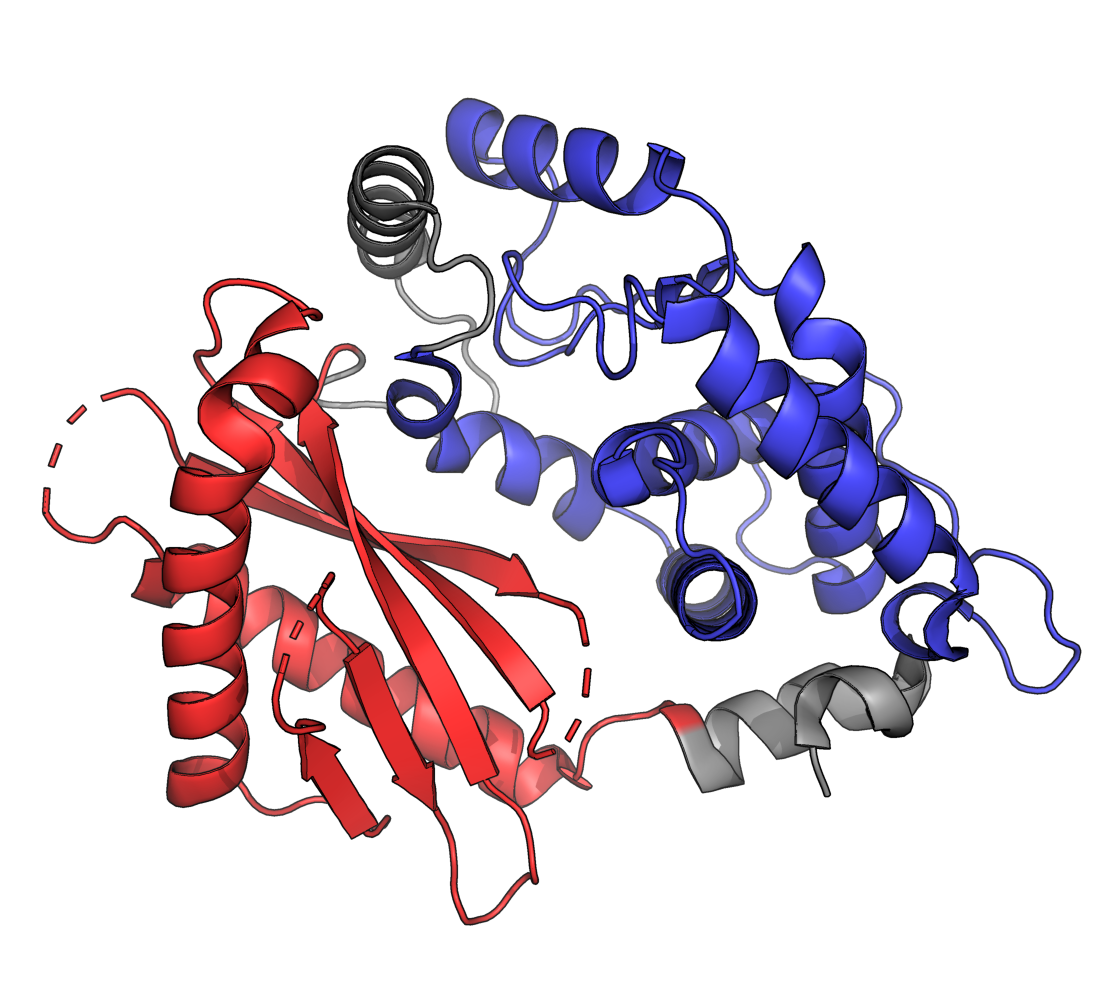
- Pig 2'-5'-oligoadenylate synthetase, N- and C-terminal domains coloured red and blue, respectively. PDB: 1PX5

Identifiers
- Symbol: OAS1_C
- Pfam: PF10421
- InterPro: IPR018952
Available protein structures:
- PDB: IPR018952 PF10421 (ECOD; PDBsum)
- AlphaFold: IPR018952; PF10421

In molecular biology, 2'-5'-oligoadenylate synthetase (2-5A synthetase) is an enzyme (EC 2.7.7.84) that reacts to interferon signal. It is an antiviral enzyme that counteracts viral attack by degrading RNAs, both viral and host. The enzyme uses ATP in 2'-specific nucleotidyl transfer reactions to synthesize 2'-5'-oligoadenylates, which activate latent ribonuclease (RNase-L), resulting in degradation of viral RNA and inhibition of virus replication.

The C-terminal half of 2'-5'-oligoadenylate synthetase, also referred to as domain 2 of the enzyme, is largely alpha-helical and homologous to a tandem ubiquitin repeat. It carries the region of enzymatic activity between at the extreme C-terminal end.

== Human proteins ==
- OAS1
- OAS2
- OAS3

== See also ==
- OASL
