= The Ohio Auction School =

Auction school

The Ohio Auction School (OAS) is an auction school located near Columbus, Ohio, United States. Many states require that individuals complete a course of study at a state approved auction school in order to be licensed to practice in that state. The Ohio Auction School provides the mandated instruction for Ohio, Indiana, Texas, Virginia, West Virginia, and Louisiana.

== History ==
The Ohio Auction School was founded in 1999 in accordance with the laws of the State of Ohio to provide auctioneer pre-licensing education. Mike Brandly, a Columbus Ohio Auctioneer, assumed the role of Executive Director; Lisa Mantle was designated the school’s Administrator.

== Curriculum ==
Topics included in the standard 80-hour pre-licensing curriculum include bid-calling (talking clearly, but fast), contracts, business practices, staffing, setup of auctions, sound equipment, computerization and online auctions, ethics, and specifics regarding the sale of livestock, antiques, collectibles, cars, coins, and real estate.

Terms are typically held twice per year, with one 2-week term in the spring and another in the fall. Since opening, The Ohio Auction School has gained accreditation in other states including Indiana, Texas, Virginia, West Virginia, and Louisiana.

Classes at the school have included students from seven states and the Islands of the Bahamas. Graduates of The Ohio Auction School have gone on to win several state bid-calling championships and become practicing auctioneers. Over 200 had attended classes through 2005.

== Continuing education ==
In 2003, The Ohio Auction School began providing continuing education classes for auctioneers and crammer sessions for those seated for auctioneer license examinations, in addition to pre-licensing auctioneer education.

== Location ==
The school’s headquarters are located at 4949 Hendron Road, Groveport, Ohio, USA (fifteen miles south-east of downtown Columbus, Ohio).
