= OAS1 =

Enzyme

Identifiers
- Aliases: OAS1, IFI-4, OIAS, OIASI, E18/E16, 2'-5'-oligoadenylate synthetase 1
- External IDs: OMIM: 164350; MGI: 2180860; GeneCards: OAS1
Available structures
PDB	Ortholog search: PDBe RCSB
PDB	List of PDB id codes 4IG8
Enzyme activity
EC #	BRENDA	ExPASy	KEGG	MetaCyc
2.7.7.84	↗	↗	↗	↗

Gene location (Human)
Chr.	Chromosome 12 (human)
Band	12q24.13	Start	112,905,856 bp
Band	12q24.13	End	112,933,219 bp

Gene location (Mouse)
Chr.	Chromosome 5 (mouse)
Band	5 F|5 60.65 cM	Start	121,034,319 bp
Band	5 F|5 60.65 cM	End	121,045,584 bp
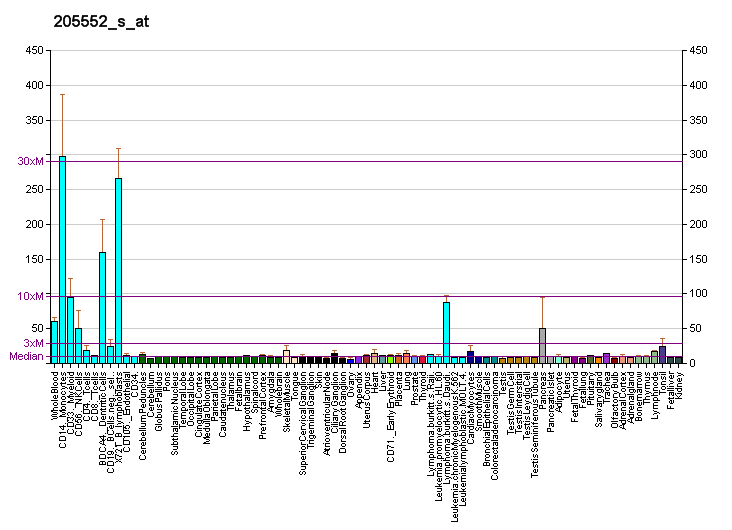

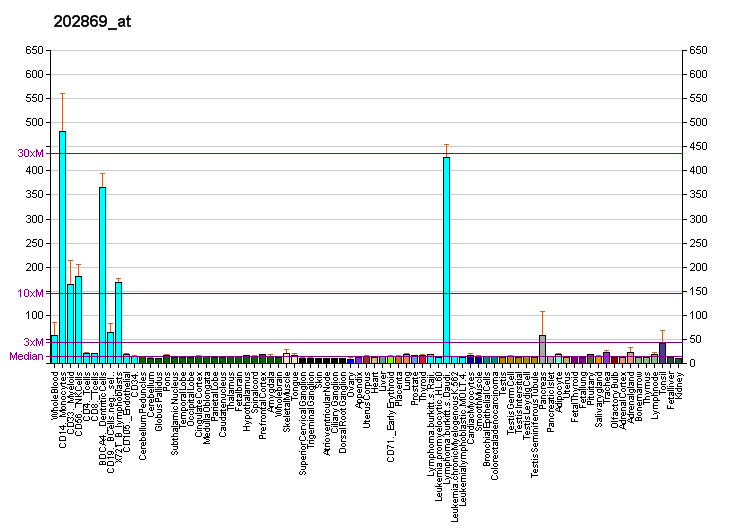
RNA expression pattern
Bgee	Human / Mouse (ortholog); Top expressed in: monocyte; mucosa of transverse colon; granulocyte; rectum; mucosa of esophagus; mucosa of ileum; spleen; gallbladder; nasal epithelium; right lobe of liver / Top expressed in: granulocyte; jejunum; ileum; colon; duodenum; placenta; yolk sac; blastocyst; thymus; bone marrow; More reference expression data
BioGPS	More reference expression data
Gene ontology
Molecular function	transferase activity; nucleotide binding; nucleotidyltransferase activity; metal ion binding; protein binding; RNA binding; double-stranded RNA binding; ATP binding; 2'-5'-oligoadenylate synthetase activity
Cellular component	cytoplasm; intracellular membrane-bounded organelle; extracellular region; endoplasmic reticulum; mitochondrion; nucleus; cytosol; nucleoplasm
Biological process	purine nucleotide biosynthetic process; regulation of ribonuclease activity; glucose homeostasis; interferon-gamma-mediated signaling pathway; immune system process; response to virus; negative regulation of viral genome replication; defense response to virus; type I interferon signaling pathway; protein complex oligomerization; immune response; glucose metabolic process; cellular response to interferon-alpha; innate immune response
Sources:Amigo / QuickGO
Orthologs
Databases	NCBI: entry; OMA: entry
Species	Human	Mouse
Entrez	4938	246730
Ensembl	ENSG00000089127	ENSMUSG00000052776
UniProt	P00973	P11928
RefSeq (mRNA)	NM_001032409; NM_002534; NM_016816; NM_001320151	NM_145211
RefSeq (protein)	NP_001027581; NP_001307080; NP_002525; NP_058132	NP_660212
Location (UCSC)	Chr 12: 112.91 – 112.93 Mb	Chr 5: 121.03 – 121.05 Mb
PubMed search
- Wikidata
View/Edit Human	View/Edit Mouse

2'-5'-oligoadenylate synthetase 1 is an enzyme that in humans is encoded by the OAS1 gene.

This gene encodes a member of the 2-5A synthetase family, which include essential proteins involved in the innate immune response to viral infection.

The encoded protein is induced by interferons and uses adenosine triphosphate in 2'-specific nucleotidyl transfer reactions to synthesize 2',5'-oligoadenylates (2-5As). These molecules activate latent RNase L, which results in both viral and endogenous RNA degradation and the inhibition of viral replication. The three known members of this gene family are located in a cluster on chromosome 12. Hypomorphic mutations in this gene have been associated with host susceptibility to viral infection, while gain-of-function variants can cause autoinflammatory immunodeficiency. Alternatively spliced transcript variants encoding different isoforms have been described.

== See also ==
- OAS2
