= Oaș =

Oaş may refer to:

- Oaş Country, an ethnographic region in northwestern Romania
  - Negreşti-Oaş, a town in Satu Mare County
  - Călineşti-Oaş, a commune in Satu Mare County
- Oaş, a village in Frata Commune, Cluj County, Romania
