= OAS3 =

Protein-coding gene in the species Homo sapiens

Available structures
PDB	Ortholog search: PDBe RCSB
PDB	List of PDB id codes 4S3N

Identifiers
- Aliases: OAS3, p100, p100OAS, 2'-5'-oligoadenylate synthetase 3
- External IDs: OMIM: 603351; MGI: 2180850; HomoloGene: 4510; GeneCards: OAS3; OMA:OAS3 - orthologs

Gene location (Human)
Chr.	Chromosome 12 (human)
Band	12q24.13	Start	112,938,051 bp
Band	12q24.13	End	112,976,460 bp

Gene location (Mouse)
Chr.	Chromosome 5 (mouse)
Band	5 F|5 60.64 cM	Start	120,891,163 bp
Band	5 F|5 60.64 cM	End	120,915,726 bp
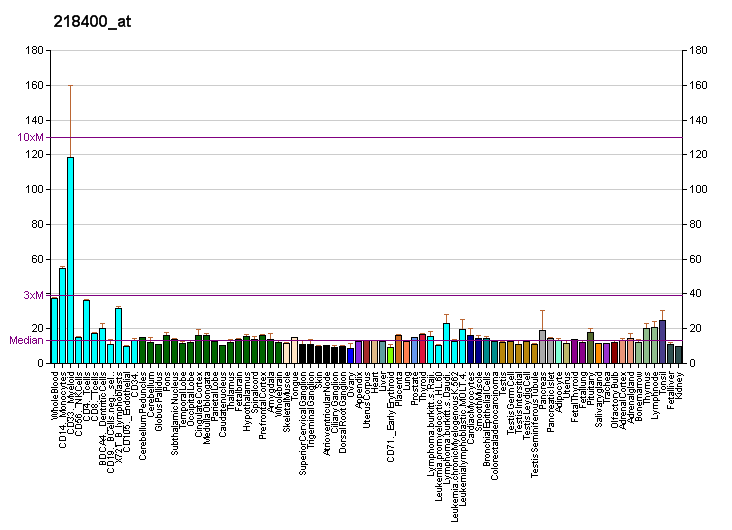
RNA expression pattern
Bgee	Human / Mouse (ortholog); Top expressed in: monocyte; granulocyte; decidua; gallbladder; apex of heart; mucosa of esophagus; appendix; bone marrow cells; oral cavity; epithelium of colon / Top expressed in: granulocyte; blood; mucous cell of stomach; intestinal villus; jejunum; bone marrow; stroma of bone marrow; zygote; thymus; spleen; More reference expression data
BioGPS	More reference expression data
Gene ontology
Molecular function	transferase activity; nucleotide binding; nucleotidyltransferase activity; metal ion binding; 2'-5'-oligoadenylate synthetase activity; protein binding; RNA binding; double-stranded RNA binding; ATP binding
Cellular component	cytoplasm; intracellular membrane-bounded organelle; plasma membrane; nucleoplasm; nucleus; extracellular space; cytosol
Biological process	regulation of ribonuclease activity; immune system process; interferon-gamma-mediated signaling pathway; response to virus; negative regulation of viral genome replication; defense response to virus; type I interferon signaling pathway; immune response; innate immune response; nucleobase-containing compound metabolic process
Sources:Amigo / QuickGO
Orthologs
Species	Human	Mouse
Entrez	4940	246727
Ensembl	ENSG00000111331	ENSMUSG00000032661
UniProt	Q9Y6K5	Q8VI93
RefSeq (mRNA)	NM_006187	NM_145226
RefSeq (protein)	NP_006178	NP_660261
Location (UCSC)	Chr 12: 112.94 – 112.98 Mb	Chr 5: 120.89 – 120.92 Mb
PubMed search
- Wikidata
View/Edit Human	View/Edit Mouse

2'-5'-oligoadenylate synthetase 3 is an enzyme that in humans is encoded by the OAS3 gene.

This gene encodes an enzyme included in the 2', 5' oligoadenylate synthase family. This enzyme is induced by interferons and catalyzes the 2', 5' oligomers of ATP. These oligomers activate latent RNase L, leading to degradation of both viral and endogenous RNA. This enzyme family plays a significant role in the inhibition of cellular protein synthesis in response to viral infection.
