= Ribonuclease L =

Enzyme found in humans

RNASEL
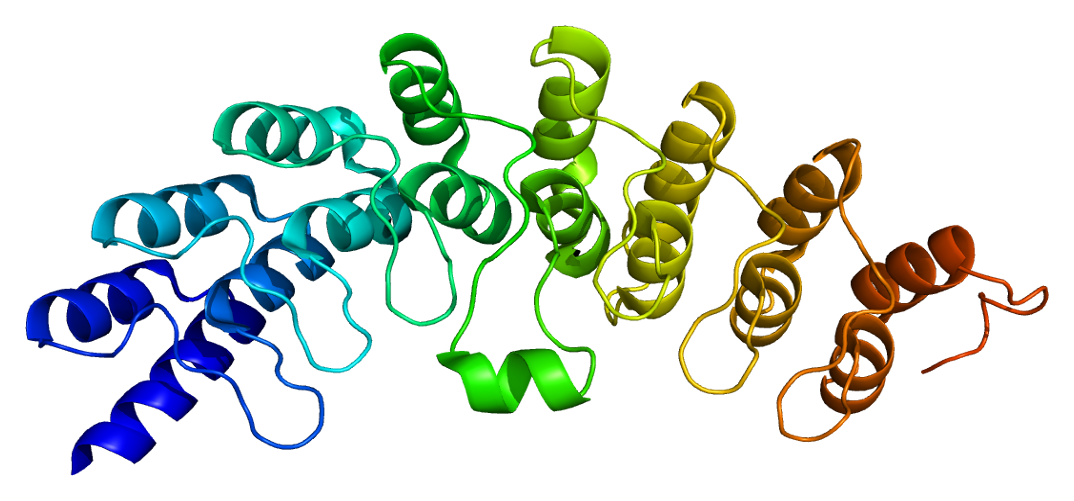

Identifiers
- Aliases: RNASEL, PRCA1, RNS4, ribonuclease L
- External IDs: OMIM: 180435; MGI: 1098272; GeneCards: RNASEL
Available structures
PDB	Ortholog search: PDBe RCSB
PDB	List of PDB id codes 1WDY, 4G8K, 4G8L, 4OAU, 4OAV

Gene location (Human)
Chr.	Chromosome 1 (human)
Band	1q25.3	Start	182,573,634 bp
Band	1q25.3	End	182,589,256 bp

Gene location (Mouse)
Chr.	Chromosome 1 (mouse)
Band	1|1 G3	Start	153,625,172 bp
Band	1|1 G3	End	153,639,967 bp
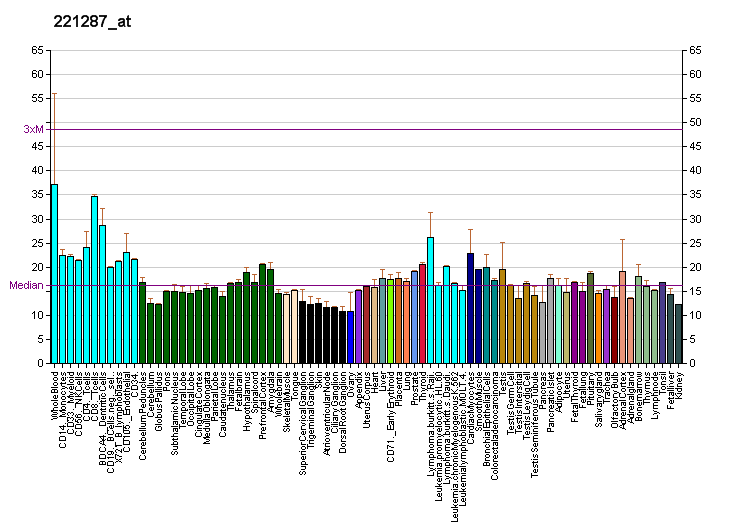
RNA expression pattern
Bgee	Human / Mouse (ortholog); Top expressed in: amniotic fluid; palpebral conjunctiva; germinal epithelium; epithelium of nasopharynx; blood; visceral pleura; mucosa of paranasal sinus; jejunal mucosa; parietal pleura; bronchial epithelial cell / Top expressed in: epithelium of small intestine; left colon; ileum; granulocyte; Rostral migratory stream; intestinal villus; stroma of bone marrow; jejunum; blood; duodenum; More reference expression data
BioGPS	More reference expression data
Gene ontology
Molecular function	nucleotide binding; protein kinase activity; rRNA binding; metal ion binding; endoribonuclease activity; ribonuclease activity; protein binding; RNA binding; nuclease activity; ribonucleoprotein complex binding; endonuclease activity; hydrolase activity; ATP binding; identical protein binding
Cellular component	cytoplasm; cytosol; nuclear matrix; mitochondrial matrix; mitochondrion; cellular component
Biological process	regulation of mRNA stability; nucleic acid phosphodiester bond hydrolysis; mRNA processing; protein phosphorylation; negative regulation of viral genome replication; RNA phosphodiester bond hydrolysis; defense response to virus; type I interferon signaling pathway; rRNA processing; fat cell differentiation; positive regulation of transcription by RNA polymerase II; RNA phosphodiester bond hydrolysis, endonucleolytic; regulation of type I interferon-mediated signaling pathway; positive regulation of glucose import
Sources:Amigo / QuickGO
Orthologs
Databases	NCBI: entry; OMA: entry
Species	Human	Mouse
Entrez	6041	24014
Ensembl	ENSG00000135828	ENSMUSG00000066800
UniProt	Q05823	Q05921
RefSeq (mRNA)	NM_021133	NM_011882
RefSeq (protein)	NP_066956	NP_036012
Location (UCSC)	Chr 1: 182.57 – 182.59 Mb	Chr 1: 153.63 – 153.64 Mb
PubMed search
- Wikidata
View/Edit Human	View/Edit Mouse

Ribonuclease L or RNase L (for latent), known sometimes as ribonuclease 4 or 2'-5' oligoadenylate synthetase-dependent ribonuclease, is an interferon (IFN)-induced ribonuclease which, upon activation, destroys all RNA within the cell (both cellular and viral) as well as inhibiting mRNA export. RNase L is an enzyme that in humans is encoded by the RNASEL gene.

This gene encodes a component of the interferon-regulated 2'-5'oligoadenylate (2'-5'A) system that functions in the antiviral and antiproliferative roles of interferons. RNase L is activated by dimerization, which occurs upon 2'-5'A binding, and results in cleavage of all RNA in the cell. This can lead to activation of MDA5, an RNA helicase involved in the production of interferons.

== Synthesis and activation ==
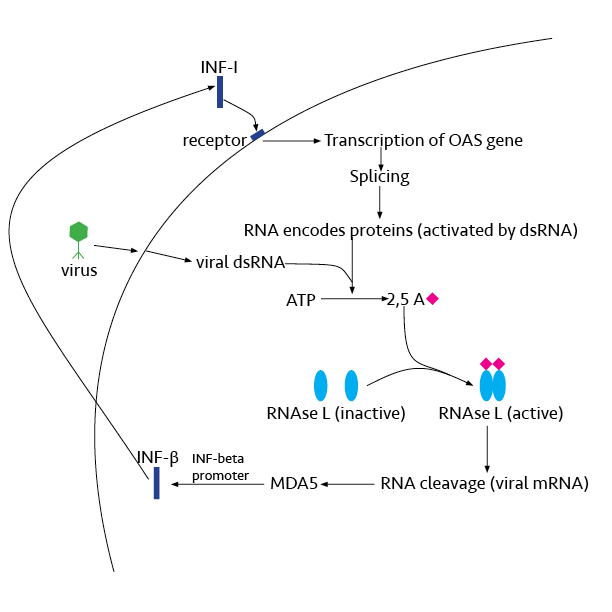
RNase L activation pathway-IFN factors bind the receptor and lead transcription and modifications of OAS. Viral dsRNA binds OAS, so that 2'-5'A is produced leading to the dimerization of RNase L. Activated RNase L cleaves all RNA in the cell, which can activate MDA5 leading to interferon production.

RNase L is present in very minute quantities during the normal cell cycle. When interferon binds to cell receptors, it activates transcription of around 300 genes to bring about the antiviral state. Among the enzymes produced is RNase L, which is initially in an inactive form. A set of transcribed genes codes for 2'-5' Oligoadenylate Synthetase (OAS). The transcribed RNA is then spliced and modified in the nucleus before reaching the cytoplasm and being translated into an inactive form of OAS. The location of OAS in the cell and the length of the 2'-5' oligoadenylate depends on the post-transcriptional and post-translational modifications of OAS.

OAS is only activated under a viral infection, when a tight binding of the inactive form of the protein with a viral dsRNA, consisting of the retrovirus' ssRNA and its complementary strand, takes place. Once active, OAS converts ATP to pyrophosphate and 2'-5'-linked oligoadenylates (2-5A), which are 5' end phosphorylated. 2-5 A molecules then bind to RNase L, promoting its activation by dimerization. In its activated form RNase L cleaves all RNA molecules in the cell leading to autophagy and apoptosis. Some of the resulting RNA fragments can also further induce the production of IFN-β as noted in the Significance section.

This dimerization and activation of RNase L can be recognized using Fluorescence Resonance Energy Transfer (FRET), as oligoribonucleotides containing a quencher and a fluorophore on opposite sites are added to a solution with inactive RNase L. The FRET signal is then recorded as the quencher and the fluorophore are very close to each other. Upon the addition of 2-5A molecules, RNase L becomes active, cleaving the oligoribonucleotides and interfering in the FRET signal.

In vitro, RNase L can be inhibited by curcumin.

== Significance ==
RNase L is part of the body's innate immune defense, namely the antiviral state of the cell. When a cell is in the antiviral state, it is highly resistant to viral attacks and is also ready to undergo apoptosis upon successful viral infection. Degradation of all RNA within the cell (which usually occurs with cessation of translation activity caused by protein kinase R) is the cell's last stand against a virus before it attempts apoptosis.

Interferon beta (IFN-β), a type I interferon responsible for antiviral activity, is induced by RNase L and melanoma differentiation-associated protein 5 (MDA5) in the infected cell. The relationship between RNase L and MDA5 in the production of IFNs has been confirmed with siRNA tests silencing the expression of either molecule and noting a marked decline in IFN production. MDA5, an RNA helicase, is known to be activated by complex high molecular weight dsRNA transcribed from the viral genome. In a cell with RNase L, MDA5 activity may be further enhanced. When active, RNase L cleaves and identifies viral RNA and feeds it into MDA5 activation sites, enhancing the production of IFN-β. The RNA fragments produced by RNase L have double stranded regions, as well as specific markers, that allow them to be identified by the RNase L and MDA5. Some studies have suggested that high levels of RNase L may actually inhibit IFN-β production, but a clear linkage still exists between RNase L activity and IFN-β production.

Furthermore, it has been shown that RNase L is involved in many diseases. In 2002, the "hereditary prostate cancer 1" locus (HPC1) was mapped to the RNASEL gene, indicating that mutations in this gene cause a predisposition to prostate cancer. Impairments of the OAS/RNase L pathway in chronic fatigue syndrome (CFS) have been investigated.
