= OAS2 =

Protein-coding gene in the species Homo sapiens

Identifiers
- Aliases: OAS2, 2'-5'-oligoadenylate synthetase 2
- External IDs: OMIM: 603350; MGI: 2180852; GeneCards: OAS2
Enzyme activity
EC #	BRENDA	ExPASy	KEGG	MetaCyc
2.7.7.84	↗	↗	↗	↗

Gene location (Human)
Chr.	Chromosome 12 (human)
Band	12q24.13	Start	112,978,395 bp
Band	12q24.13	End	113,011,723 bp

Gene location (Mouse)
Chr.	Chromosome 5 (mouse)
Band	5 F|5 60.64 cM	Start	120,868,398 bp
Band	5 F|5 60.64 cM	End	120,887,918 bp
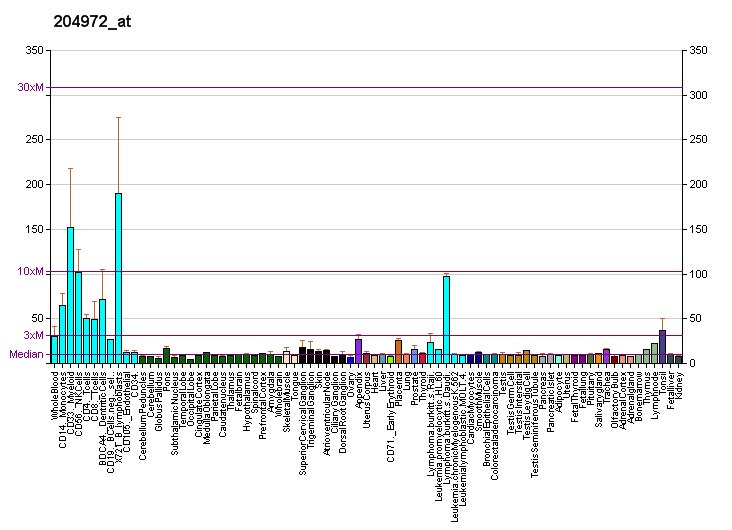
RNA expression pattern
Bgee	Human / Mouse (ortholog); Top expressed in: monocyte; granulocyte; lymph node; decidua; appendix; gallbladder; spleen; right lung; blood; olfactory zone of nasal mucosa / Top expressed in: mucous cell of stomach; granulocyte; stroma of bone marrow; submandibular gland; epithelium of stomach; blood; gastrula; myocardium of ventricle; subcutaneous adipose tissue; cervix; More reference expression data
BioGPS	More reference expression data
Gene ontology
Molecular function	transferase activity; nucleotide binding; nucleotidyltransferase activity; zinc ion binding; metal ion binding; 2'-5'-oligoadenylate synthetase activity; protein binding; RNA binding; double-stranded RNA binding; ATP binding
Cellular component	cytoplasm; membrane; endoplasmic reticulum; mitochondrion; perinuclear region of cytoplasm; nucleus; nucleoplasm; cytosol; intracellular membrane-bounded organelle
Biological process	purine nucleotide biosynthetic process; interferon-gamma-mediated signaling pathway; immune system process; protein myristoylation; response to virus; RNA catabolic process; protein glycosylation; defense response to virus; type I interferon signaling pathway; immune response; innate immune response; nucleobase-containing compound metabolic process; response to bacterium; regulation of ribonuclease activity; regulation of lactation
Sources:Amigo / QuickGO
Orthologs
Databases	NCBI: entry; OMA: entry
Species	Human	Mouse
Entrez	4939	246728
Ensembl	ENSG00000111335	ENSMUSG00000032690
UniProt	P29728	E9Q9A9
RefSeq (mRNA)	NM_001032731; NM_002535; NM_016817	NM_145227; NM_001347448
RefSeq (protein)	NP_001027903; NP_002526; NP_058197	NP_001334377; NP_660262
Location (UCSC)	Chr 12: 112.98 – 113.01 Mb	Chr 5: 120.87 – 120.89 Mb
PubMed search
- Wikidata
View/Edit Human	View/Edit Mouse

2'-5'-oligoadenylate synthetase 2 is an enzyme that in humans is encoded by the OAS2 gene.

This gene encodes a member of the 2-5A synthetase family, essential proteins involved in the innate immune response to viral infection. The encoded protein is induced by interferons and uses adenosine triphosphate in 2'-specific nucleotidyl transfer reactions to synthesize 2',5'-oligoadenylates (2-5As). These molecules activate latent RNase L, which results in viral RNA degradation and the inhibition of viral replication. The three known members of this gene family are located in a cluster on chromosome 12. Alternatively spliced transcript variants encoding different isoforms have been described.
