= Lina Al-Tarawneh =

Jordanian-Qatari climate activist (born 2000)

Lina Nayel Al-Tarawneh (born 2000 Qatar) is a Jordanian climate activist.

== Biography ==
She lives in Doha and studies medicine at Qatar University.

In 2015, she and her family made a trip to Al Khor Island. In October 2016, she won a Harvard Social Innovation Collaborative Global Trailblazer competition. In 2017, with her sister Dina, she founded the NGO Green Mangroves. In 2017, she received a $15,000 grant from the Ford Motor Company. She purchased kayaks, which the organization uses to organize kayak trips with the aim of clearing litter. She spoke at the Qatar Youth Innovation and Entrepreneurship Conference.

She was chosen as campus director of the University of Qatar with her Millennium Fellowship Project : The Sustainable Wardrobe (formerly: The Slow Wardrobe ) on sustainable clothing. She sews her own clothes with linen fabrics, which come from flax, and are biodegradable.

Al-Tarawneh was one of 26 young climate activists around the world honored as Doha's #SolvingIt26 Debates at Youth4Climate's Pre-COP26 Conference in Milan, the precursor to the 2021 United Nations Climate Change Conference.
