= Microburin =

Waste product from manufacture of lithic tools

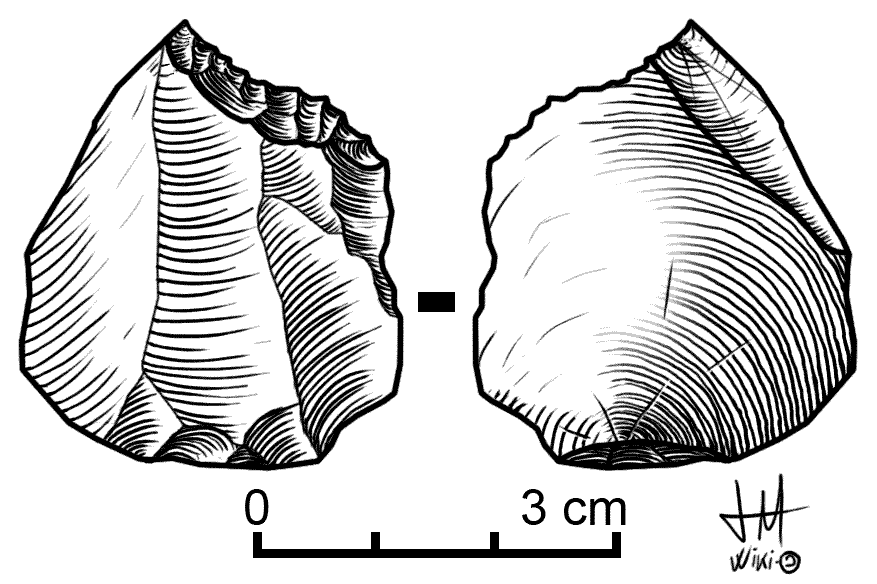
Microburin

A microburin is a characteristic waste product from manufacture of lithic tools — sometimes confused with an authentic burin — which is characteristic of the Mesolithic, but which has been recorded from the end of the Upper Paleolithic until the Chalcolithic. This type of lithic artifact was first named by Henri Breuil who defined it as "a type of angular, smooth, with a terminal retouch in the form of a small notch". Breuil initially thought that the microburins had a functional use as a type of microlithic burin. However, he later came to realize that the manufacturing technique was different from that of the burin and that they could be waste products from the manufacture of microliths, but they may have occasionally been reused for a useful purpose, which is expected for parsimonious lithic resource exploitation.

A microburin is a fragment of a lithic flake, or more precisely, of a lithic blade, that shows on its upper face the beginnings of a notch terminating in an oblique flection (whose surface can only be seen from the lower side) that ends in a very acute trihedral apex. It was thought that microburins were exclusively a class of functional microliths, but knapping experiments, along with the refitting of contiguous pieces, have demonstrated that they are a characteristic waste product of an advanced lithic reduction process known as microburin technique - or more correctly, microburin blow technique, following a study of thousands of microburins originating from a variety of Saharan sites. Jacques Tixier noted that none of the examples studied showed unambiguous traces of intentional use, which also validates observation of lack of use wear from analysis of European pieces. Examples found in Europe can be seen on this page : https://web.archive.org/web/20090131231751/http://archeobase.be/page_microburins_meso.html, which are associated with Mesolithic hunters of Wallonia (Belgium) (approximately 9,000 BP).

There is also a particular type of microburin named after Krukowski that is from a carving accident and not a waste byproduct.

== See also ==
- Microlith
- Microburin technique
