= Microburin technique =

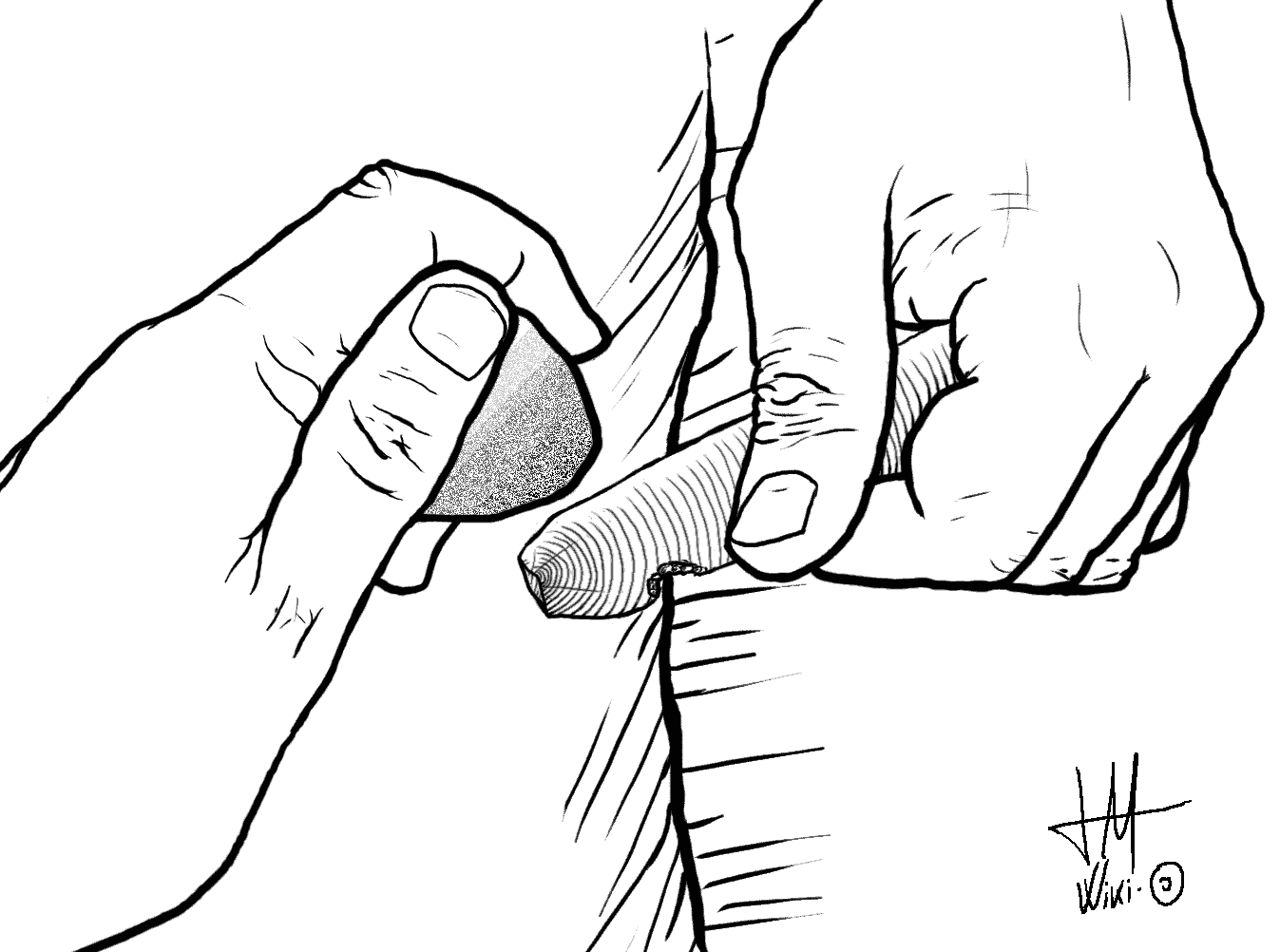
Creation of a notch using light blows against an angled support

The microburin technique is a special procedure for cutting up lithic blades which yields fragments that can be used in the manufacture of utensils. The usable fragments are basically geometric microliths. This technique has been recorded through the Old World, from at least the Mesolithic. It has also been recorded from the later phases of the Upper Paleolithic, as triangular and trapeze shaped microliths have been found from the end of the French Magdalenian although they are very rare. The microburin blow technique has not been found, at present, in the New World.

The technique consists of taking a blade (a flake can also be used) and placing its upper end against a support with a sharp edge (as occurs in the use of an anvil). A notch is then made and enlarged using light blows or by pressing the edge of the piece against the angled edge of the support. The notch is enlarged until the lithic blade snaps with a gentle but positive action (flection).

If the technique is carried out effectively, the break should be oblique to the axis of the blade and near to its proximal zone, giving two different pieces: which are called respectively the proximal microburin, which is the smaller of the two pieces and which retains the heel and conchoidal flakes from the original piece; and the trihedral apex, that is the larger part of the blade. The flexion break is also slightly curved and oblique to the faces of the blade: the plane of the break is curved such that it can be seen in the upper face of the trihedral apex and its negative can be seen in the lower face of the microburin.

It is thought that the microburin blow technique was born from the repetition of an accident that occurs when forming laminar microliths. The accident, which causes the unwanted breaking of the microlith, can occur when the blade is subjected to abrupt retouches on one of its sides. Therefore the technique is more comparable to a technological evolution than it is to a new invention.

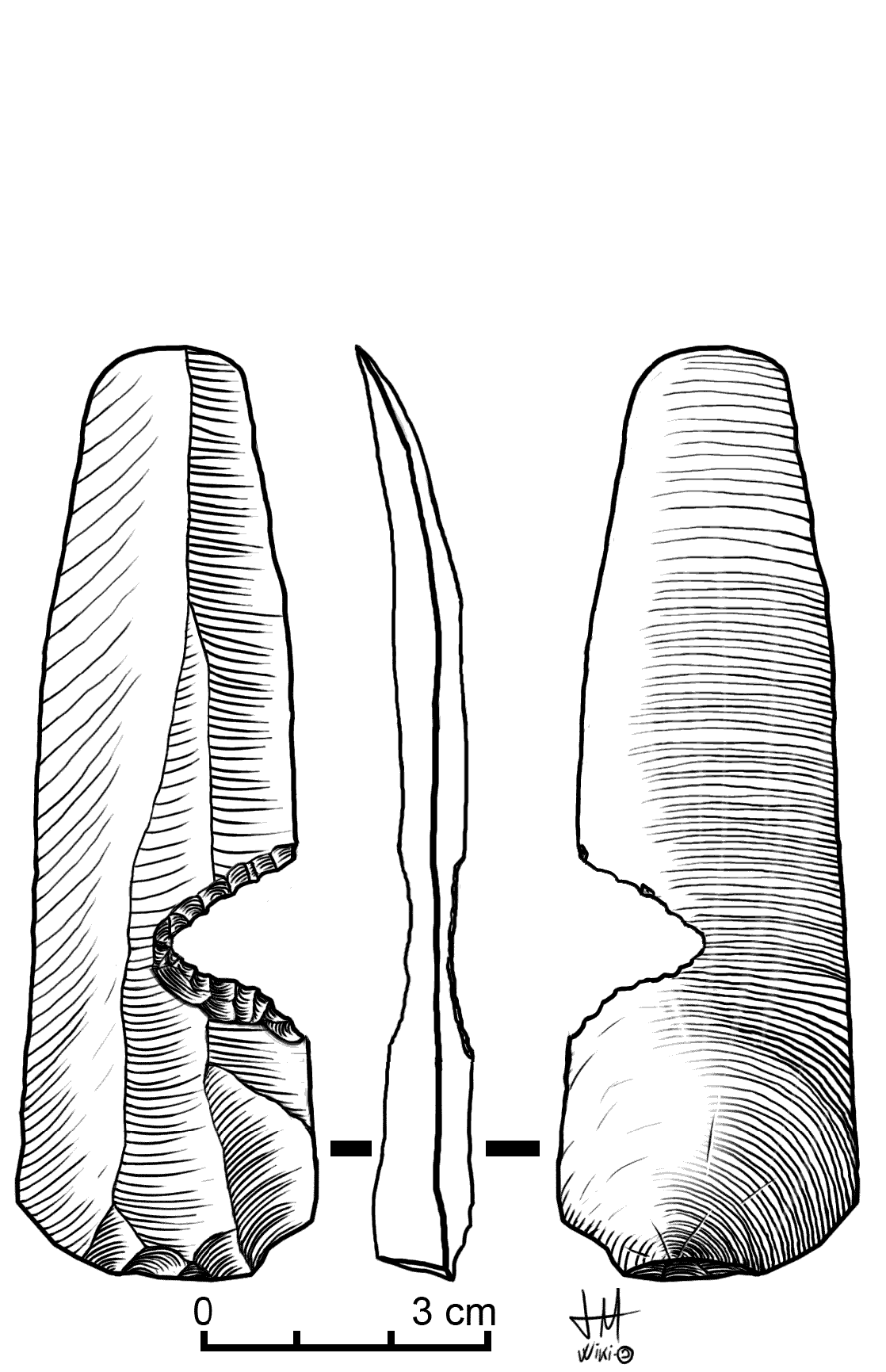
Notch in the proximal zone of the blade, just before the microburin flection

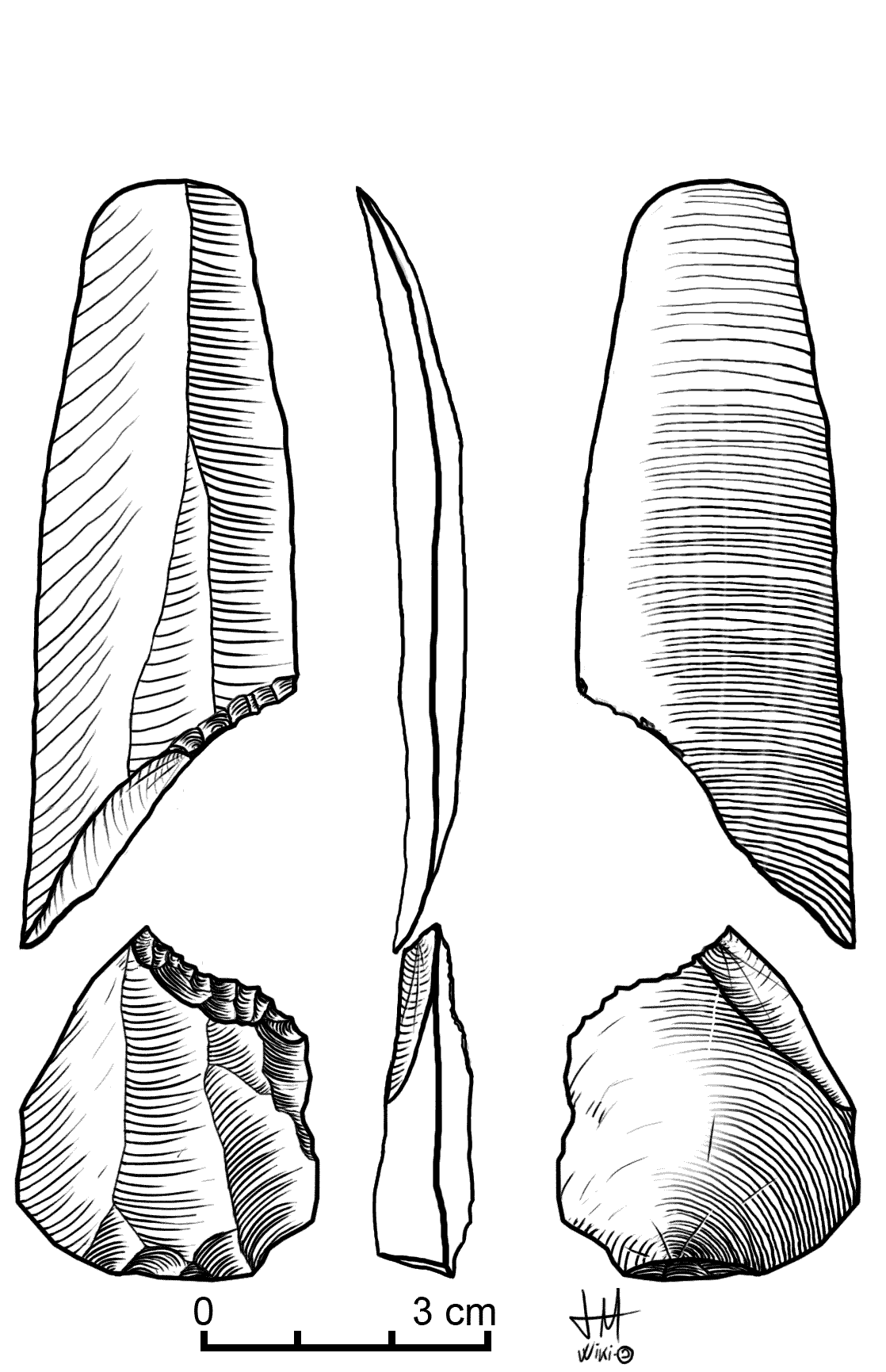
Product of the microburin flection: a proximal microburin and a trihedral apex

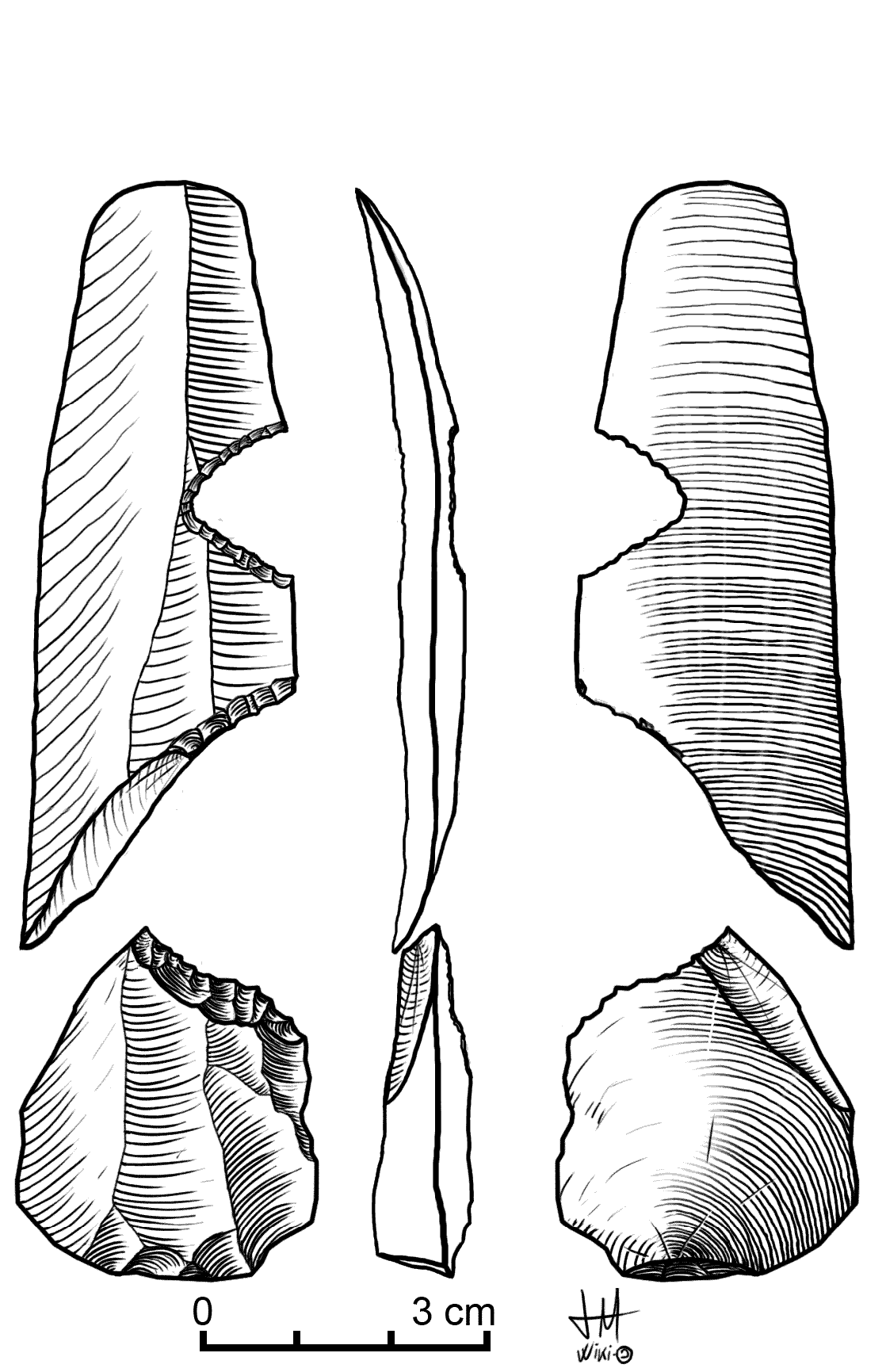
Creation of a second distal notch by the same technique already described

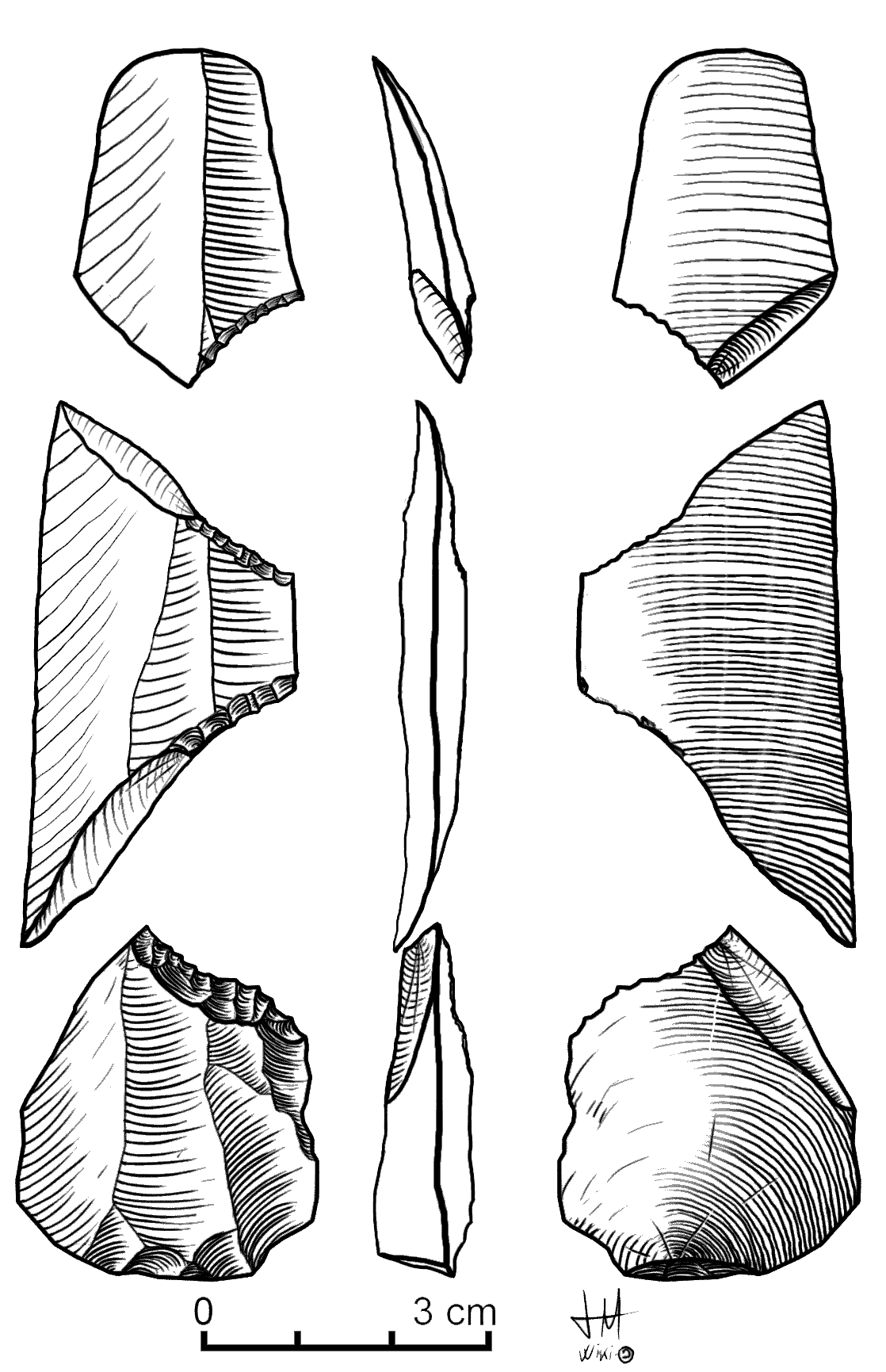
Second flection resulting in a double trihedral apex and a distal microburin

The microburin is a characteristic waste product of this technique, such that no function can be attributed to it (although some authors do not discount that these waste pieces were not later put to some use, this has not been demonstrated irrefutably). On the other hand the trihedral apex is the raw material used for the manufacture of microliths, such as backed edge blades. Usually the trihedral apex is subjected to the technique again until another flection yields another two pieces, known as the distal microburin (another characteristic waste product) and the central part of the worked piece that possesses a double trihedral apex, with converging fracture lines.

This double trihedral apex can then be used to form geometric microliths (triangles, trapezes or lunate-shaped) following abrupt retouching of both worked edges. Often the retouching does not cover the whole edge and it is possible to see part of the fracture plain on these microliths. This has allowed researchers to reconstruct with a great deal of certainty the actions of the artisans who made these microliths.

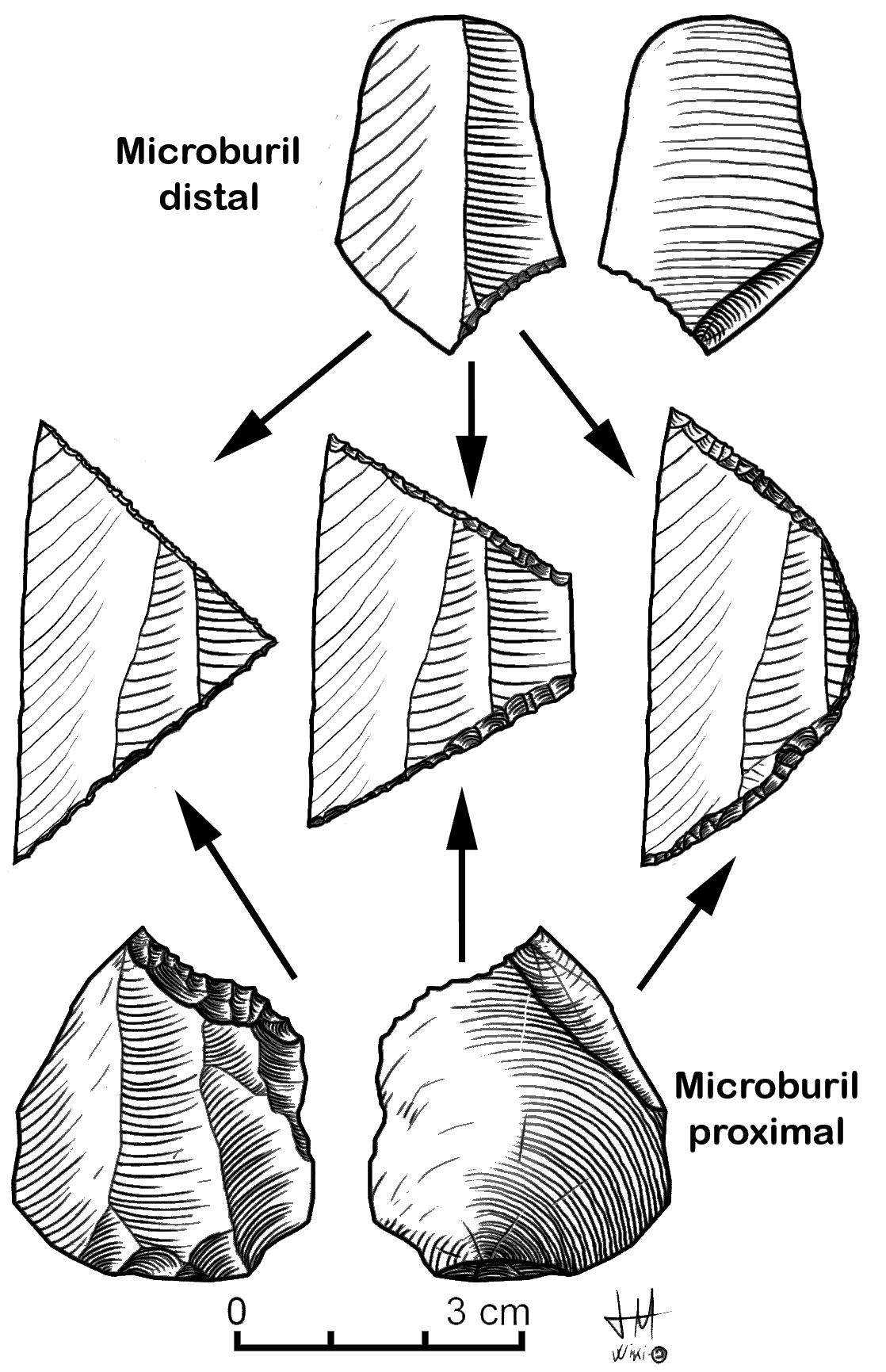
It is possible to form many types of microliths from the same blade

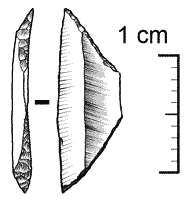
Trapeze

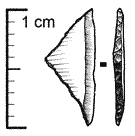
Triangle

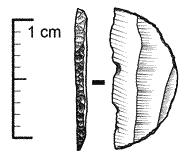
Lunate

The same microburin blow technique can be used to form other types of non-geometric microliths, such as, for example, the Tardenois tips.

== See also ==
- Microlith
