= Téviec =

Uninhabited island and Mesolithic archeological site off the coast of Brittany, France

- Location within France

Geography
- Location: Europe
- Coordinates: 47°33′21″N 3°9′54″W
- Archipelago: Quiberon

Administration
- France
- Region: Brittany
- Department: Morbihan

Téviec or Théviec is an island situated to the west of the isthmus of the peninsula of Quiberon, near Saint-Pierre-Quiberon in Brittany, France. The island is an important archaeological site due to its occupation during the Mesolithic period. Many archaeological finds have been made dating back to over 6,700 years before the present day, including the remains of over 20 people. One of the most remarkable finds was that of the grave of two young women who had apparently died violently but had received an elaborate burial under a "roof" of antlers, their bodies decorated with jewellery made from shells.

== Status of the island ==
Téviec is privately owned and since 12 January 1982 it has been the subject of a biotope protection scheme (an arrêté préfectoral de protection de biotope or APPB), which aims to preserve important biotopes. Landing on the island is generally prohibited from 15 April to 31 August.

== Archaeological sites ==
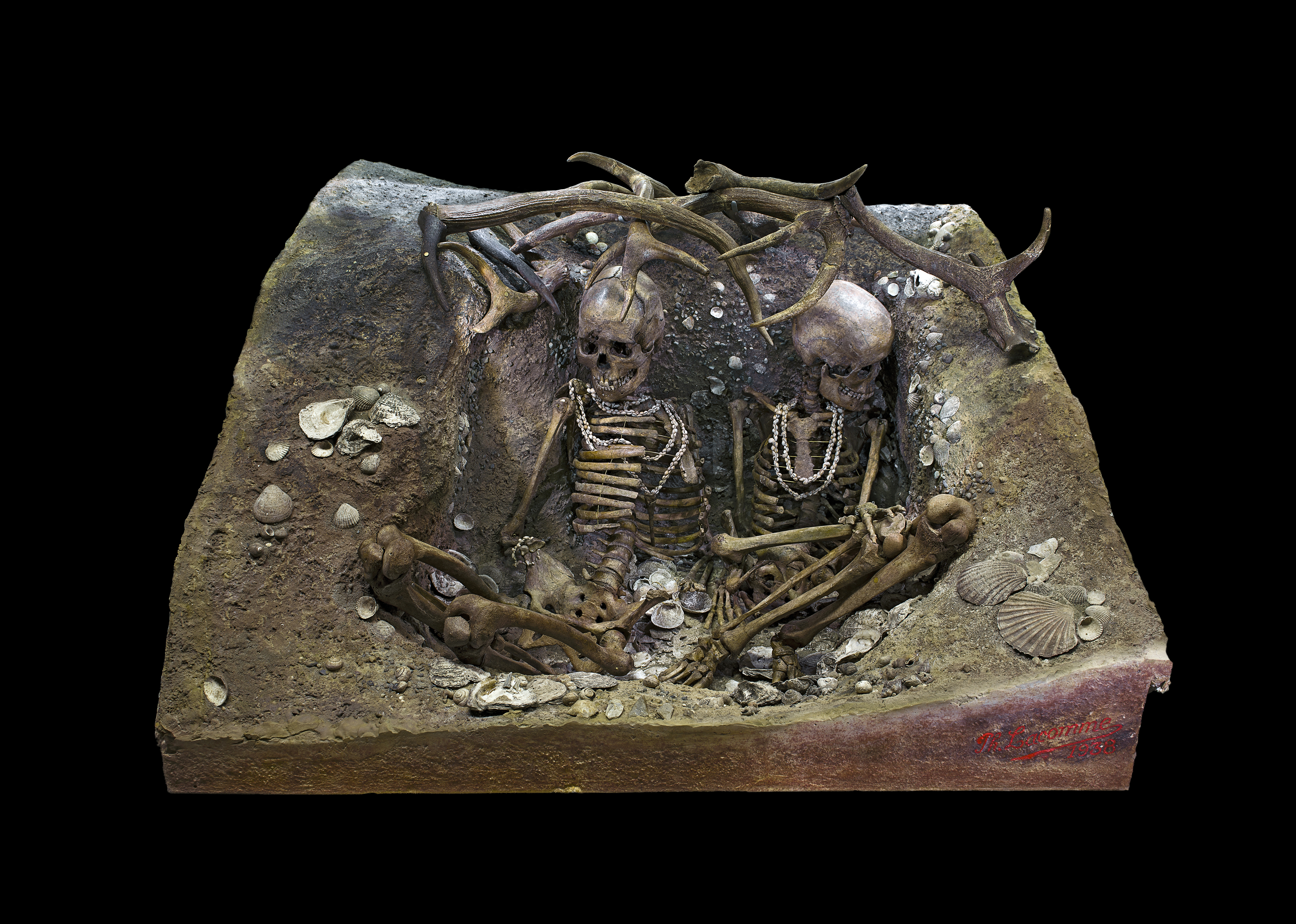
The skeletons of two women who died violently were discovered at Téviec, buried under a "roof" of antlers and decorated with necklaces made of shells

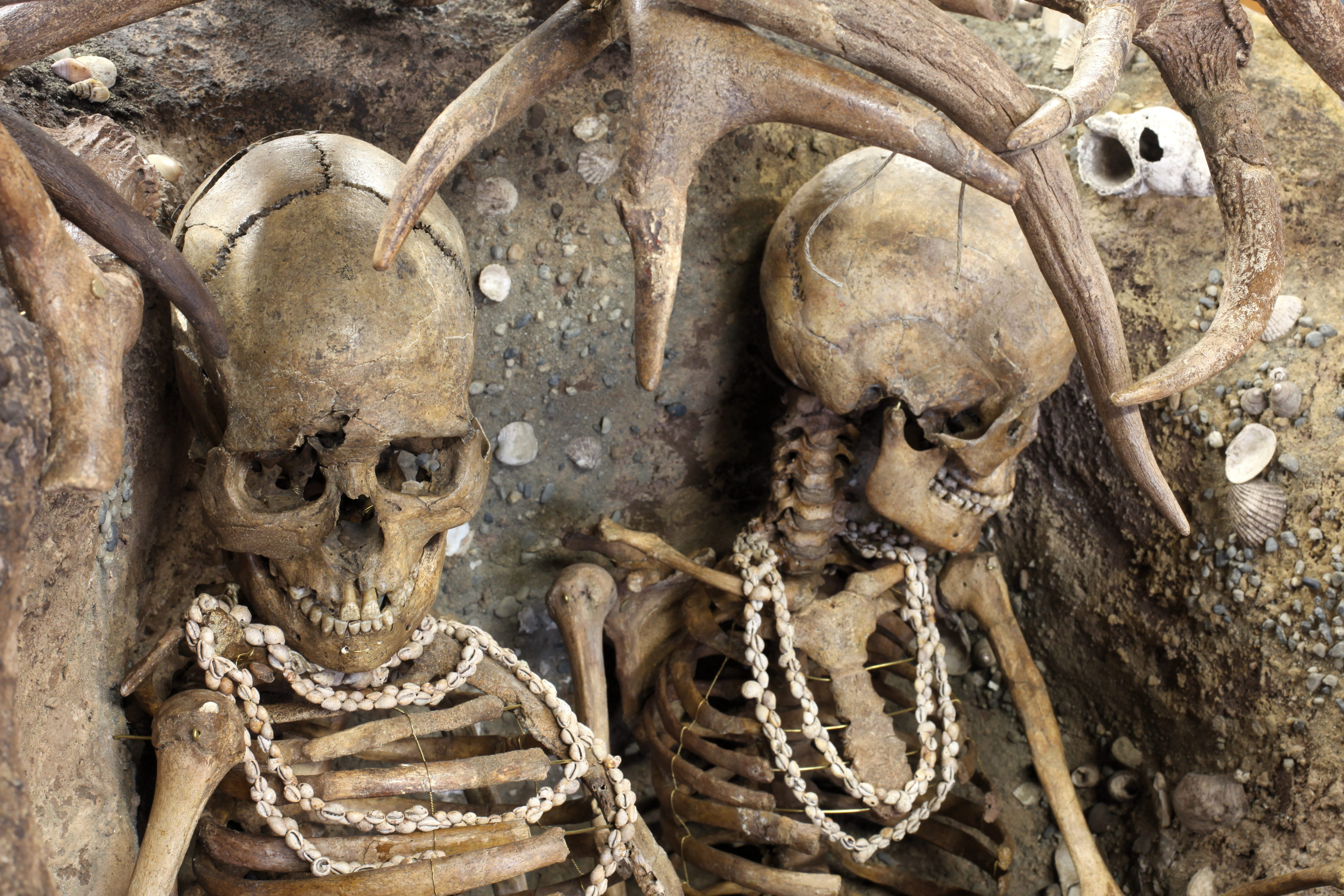
Close-up of the skeletons, showing their shell necklaces

From 1928 to 1934, archaeologists Marthe and Saint-Just Péquart discovered and excavated a range of Mesolithic habitats and a necropolis of the same period. The island is one of only a few known Mesolithic sites in Brittany, along with Pointe de la Torche, Hoëdic and Beg er Vil on the Quiberon peninsula. During the Mesolithic period, the sea level was much lower – it was possible to walk from France to England – and Téviec was situated in a lagoon. Extensive middens were found near places of habitation on the island, containing the remains of shellfish, crustaceans, squid, fish, birds, cetaceans and terrestrial mammals including wild boar, red deer, roe deer, dogs and so on. The hunter-gatherers of Téviec buried their own dead in the middens. This helped to preserve the graves, as the carbonates from the shells in the middens insulated human bones from the acid soil.

Many tools made of bone and antler were found along with numerous flint microliths. They were originally believed to date to 6575 years BP (± 350 years) but have now been dated to between 6740 and 5680 years BP. This indicates a longer occupation than previously thought, with its end coming at the beginning of the Neolithic period.

Ten multiple graves were discovered at Téviec containing a total of 23 individuals, including adults and children. Some of the remains were scattered between different locations. Several of those interred appear to have died violent deaths. One individual was found to have a flint arrowhead stuck in a vertebra. In another grave, the skeletons of two women aged 25–35, dubbed the "ladies of Téviec", were found with signs of violence on both. One had sustained five blows to the head, two of which would have been fatal, and had received at least one arrow shot between the eyes. The other had also traces of injuries. However, this diagnosis is disputed by some archaeologists, who have suggested that the weight of earth above the grave may have been responsible for damaging the skeletons.

The bodies had been buried with great care in a pit that was partly dug into the ground and covered over with debris from the midden. They had been protected by a roof made of antlers and provided with a number of grave goods including pieces of flint and boar bones, and jewellery made of sea shells drilled and assembled into necklaces, bracelets and ringlets for the legs. The grave assemblage was excavated from the site in one piece and is now on display at the Muséum de Toulouse, where its restoration in 2010 earned a national award.
