= Jacques Tixier =

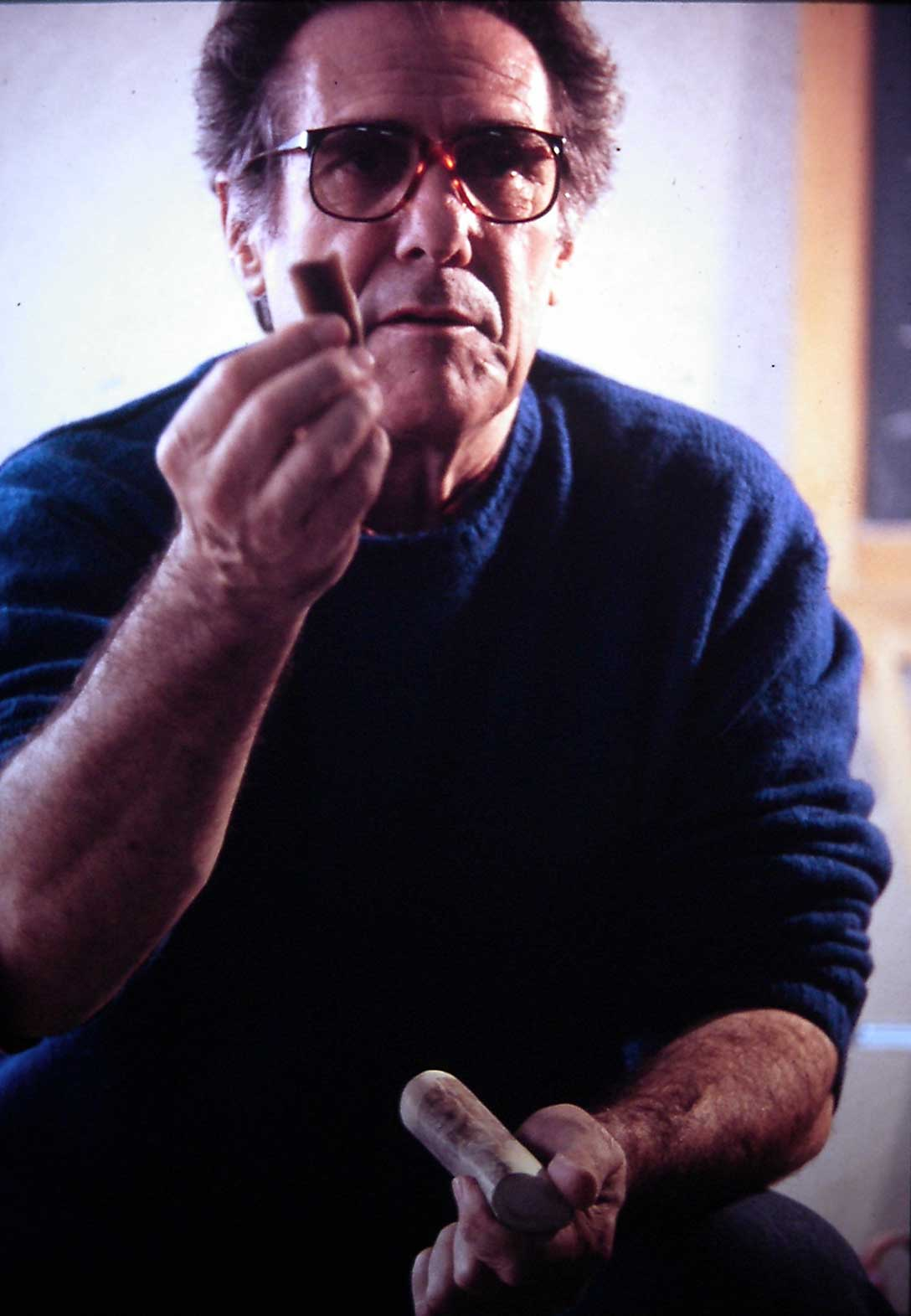
Jacques Tixier

Jacques Tixier (French pronunciation: [ʒak tiksje]; 1 January 1925 – 3 April 2018) was a French archaeologist and prehistorian notable for his work on prehistory in Qatar, Lebanon, and North Africa. He led the first French archaeological mission to Qatar in 1976. His team, Mission Archéologique Français à Qatar, discovered Al Khor Island that year. He also discovered an archaeological site in Shagra. Tixier published one of two volumes of the team's findings in 1980, with the second volume being published by his colleague Marie‐Louise Inizan in 1988.
