= Al Khor Island =

Island in Qatar

- جزيرة الخور (Arabic)
- Jazirat bin Ghanim; Khor Ile; Purple Island
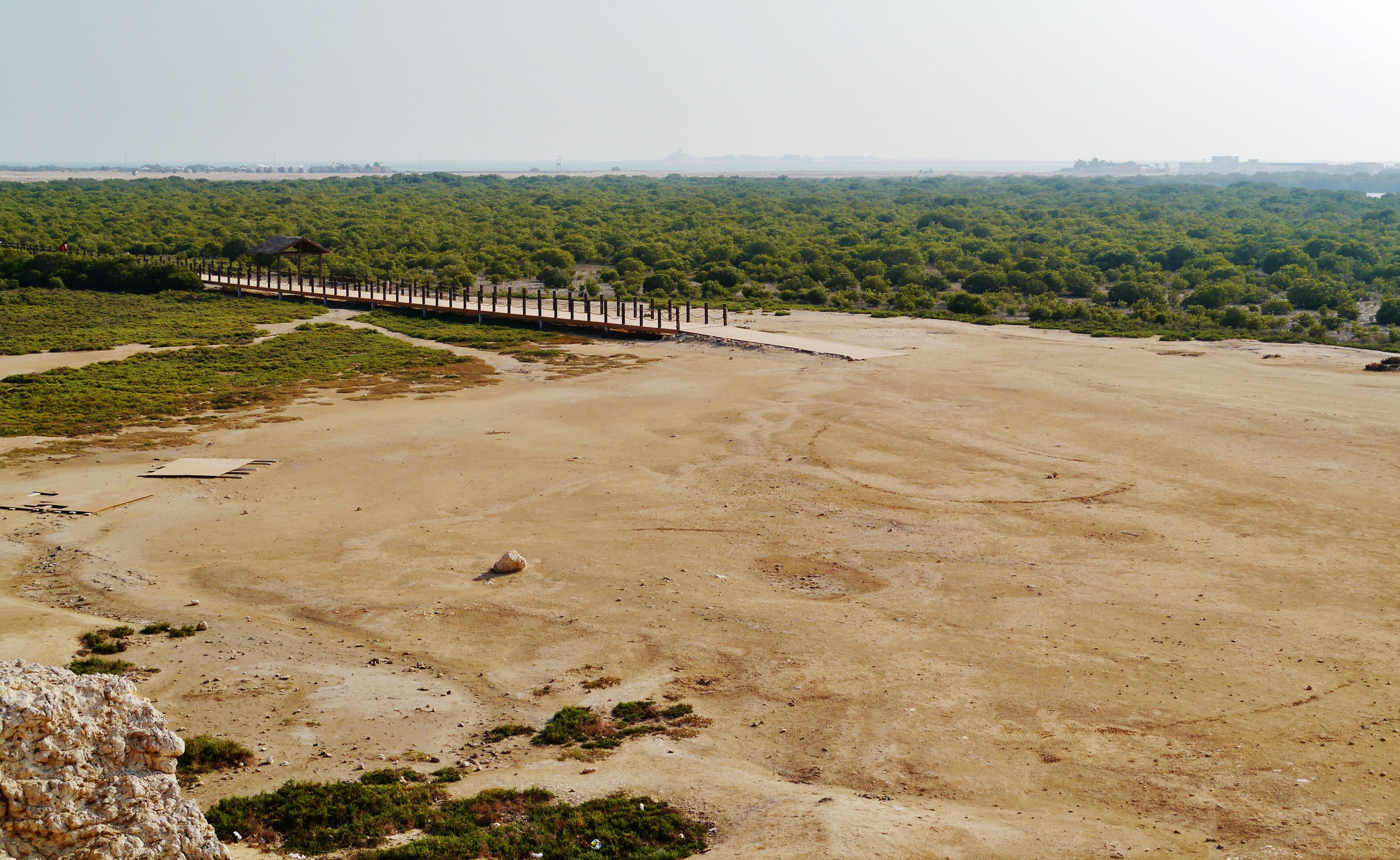
- Far view of Al Khor Island

- Location within Qatar
- 25°41′34″N 51°32′56″E
- Type: Settlement
- Periods: Neolithic period Bronze Age
- Cultures: Dilmun; Kassites
- Location: Northeast Qatar

Site notes
- Area: 1.67 km^{2} (0.64 sq mi)
- Excavation dates: 1976
- Archaeologists: Jacques Tixier

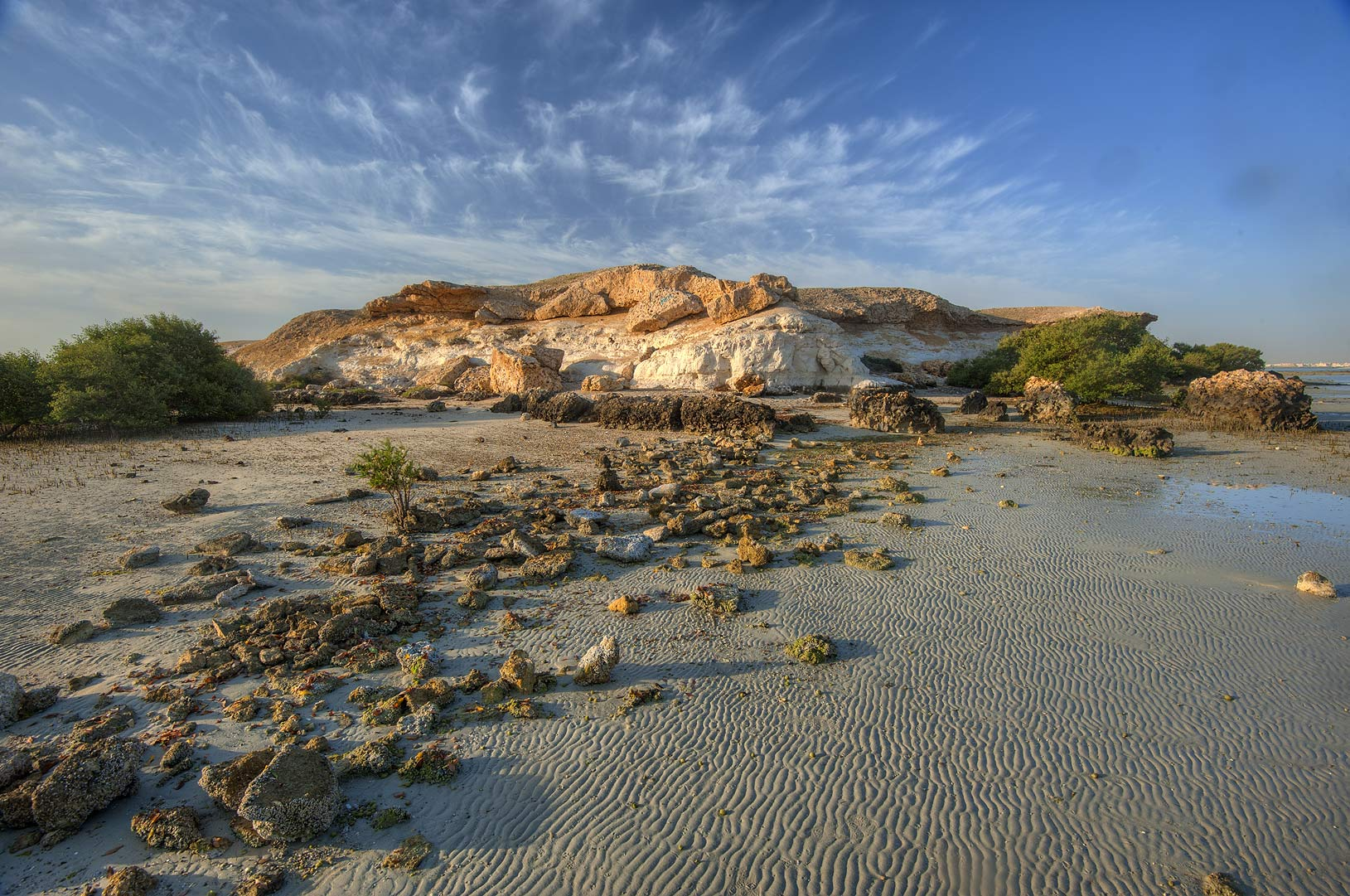
Hillock on northern end of Al Khor Island.

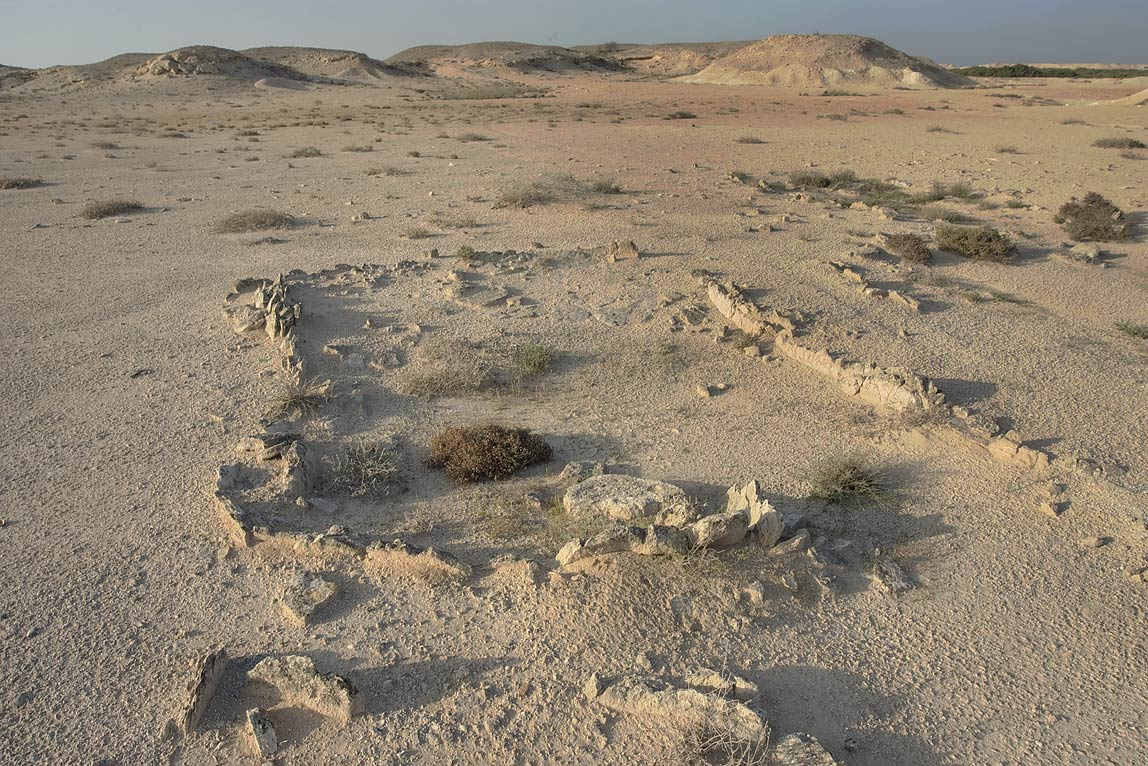
Excavation of the Kassite dye site on Al Khor Island.

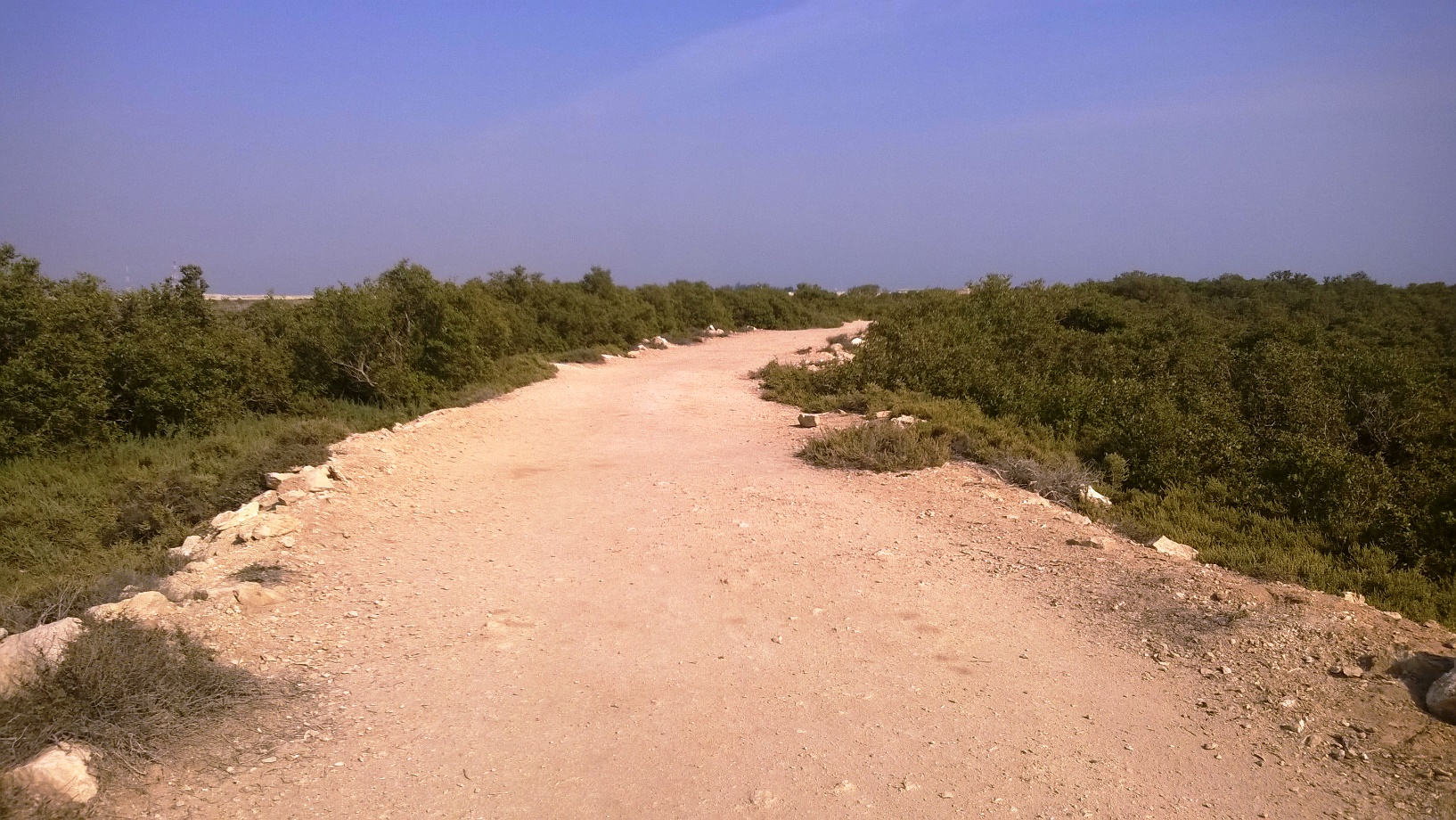
Dirt path in Al Khor Island.

Al Khor Island (Arabic: جزيرة الخور), also known as Jazirat bin Ghanim or Purple Island, is an island located in the municipality of Al Khor on the northeast coast of Qatar. It accommodates the only archaeological site in the country attributable to the second millennium BC. There are four main periods of occupation on the island, dating from as early as c. 2000 BC to as late as 1900 AD. The island is best known for being the site of operation of a Kassite-controlled purple dye industry in the second millennium BC.

It is one of the most popular tourist attractions in the country due to its lush mangrove forest and diverse landscape and ecology.

== Geography ==
Al Khor Island is located approximately 50 km (31 mi) north of the capital Doha. It is connected to land by a tapered dirt pathway which runs through a number of streams.

Spanning an area of 1.67 km^{2} (0.64 sq mi) the island lies on the eastern side of a sheltered bay which is overlooked by the city of Al Khor. The width of the bay ranges from 2.2 to 6.5 km (1.4 to 4.0 mi). It is linked to the open sea by a channel with a width of roughly 750 meters (2,460 ft) on its southern end. It is separated from the city of Al Khor by 420 meters (1,380 ft) of low water. Many mangroves (Avicennia marina) are found off its southeast and east coast. There is no potable water on the island but known sources are nearby.

The island has numerous limestone outcroppings, the tallest of which is roughly 8.5 meters (28 ft). On the coast there are crumbly and level-surfaced beachrock formations, upon which various sea snail shells were discovered. While the relatively high outcroppings contain traces of man-made structures such as burial mounds, the vast majority of archaeological discoveries were made on the level areas surrounding these outcroppings.

== Archaeology ==
=== Neolithic ===
Definitive occupation of the island during the Neolithic period is inconclusive. Several Neolithic campsites and Ubaid potsherds were discovered approximately 6 km (3.7 mi) east of the island. It has been suggested that the island was visited by these Neolithic inhabitants.

=== Early Dilmun period ===
Pottery originating from the Dilmun civilization suggests the island was linked with the Bahrain-based civilization from c. 2000 BC to 1750 BC. Ceramics dating to the early Dilmun period consist mainly of medium-sized jars and cooking pots. The settlements dating to the Dilmun period may have been established to expedite trade journeys between Bahrain to the closest significant settlement in the Persian Gulf, Tell Abraq. Another scenario entails that the encampments were created by visiting fishermen or pearl fishers from Dilmun. It has also been suggested that the presence of pottery is indicative of trade between the inhabitants of Al Khor Island and the Dilmun civilization, though this is considered unlikely due to the scarce population of Qatar during this period.

=== Kassite period ===
The Kassites operated a purple dye industry on the island from c. 1400 to 1100 BC. There were also trade relations between the inhabitants of Qatar and the Kassite. Among the findings were 3,000,000 crushed snail shells and Kassite potsherds. It has been asserted that the island is the site of the earliest known production of purple shellfish dye. The dye was obtained from the murex snail and dubbed "Tyrian purple".

=== Sasanian period ===
Artifacts originating from the late Sasanian period, from c. 400 to 600 AD, were found here.

=== Late Islamic period ===
Al Khor Island was inhabited during the late Islamic period, from c. 1700 to 1900.

=== Research history ===
The site was already known before 1976, but it was first systematically studied by the Mission Archéologique Française à Qatar, a French team led by Jacques Tixier, in 1976.

== Gallery ==
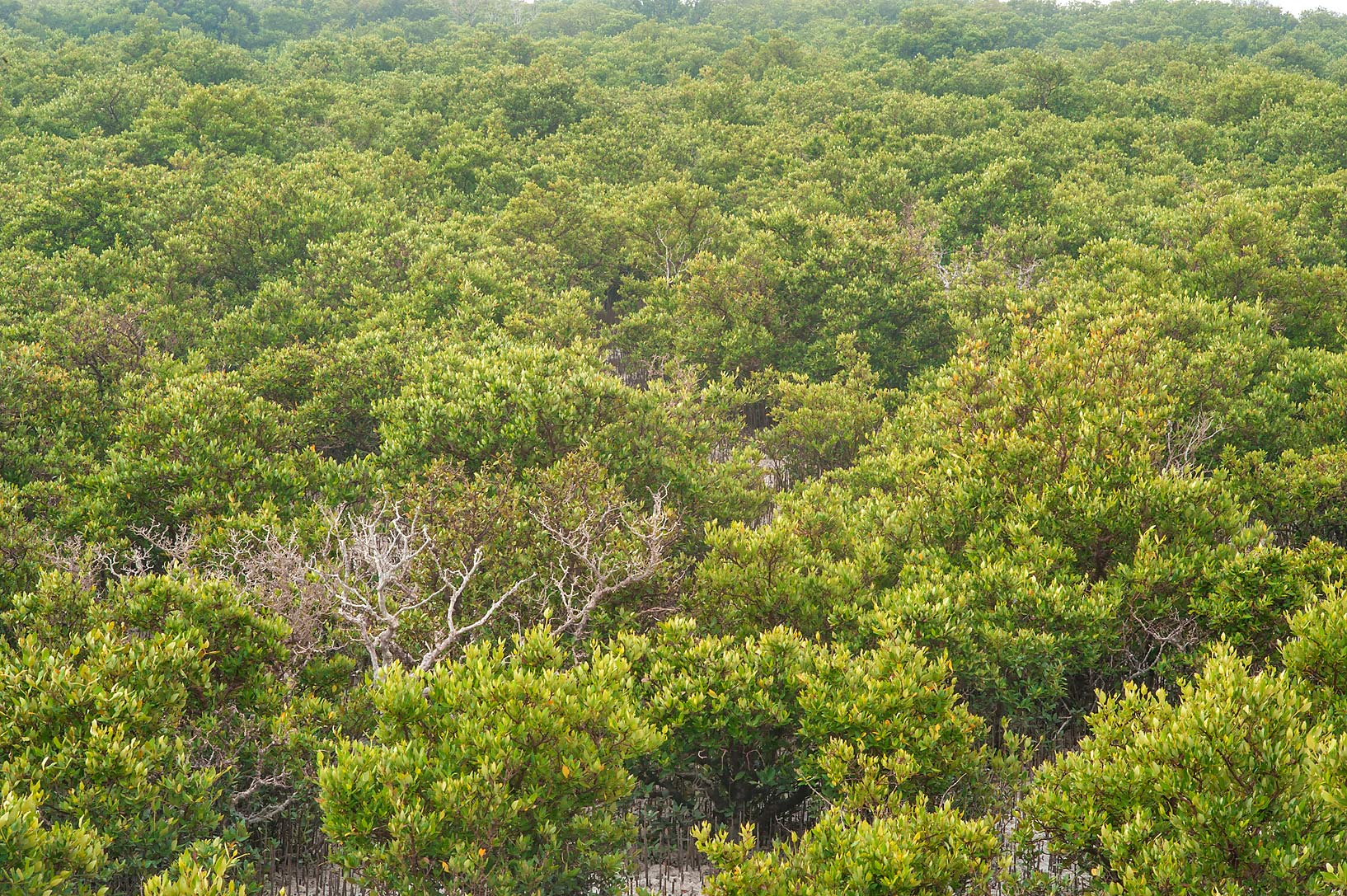
Mangroves in salt marshes of Al Khor Island.

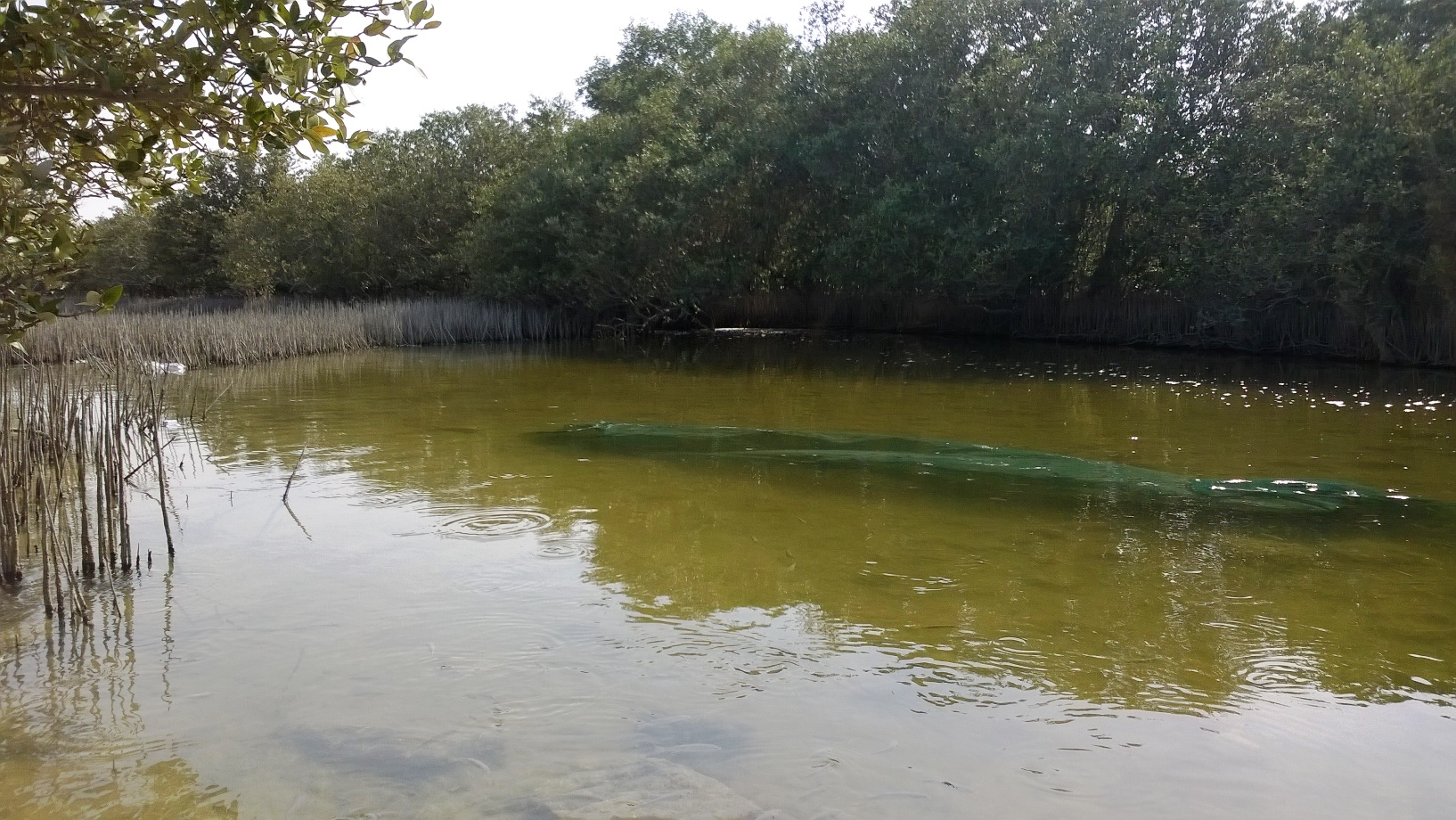
Mangrove forest in Al Khor Island.

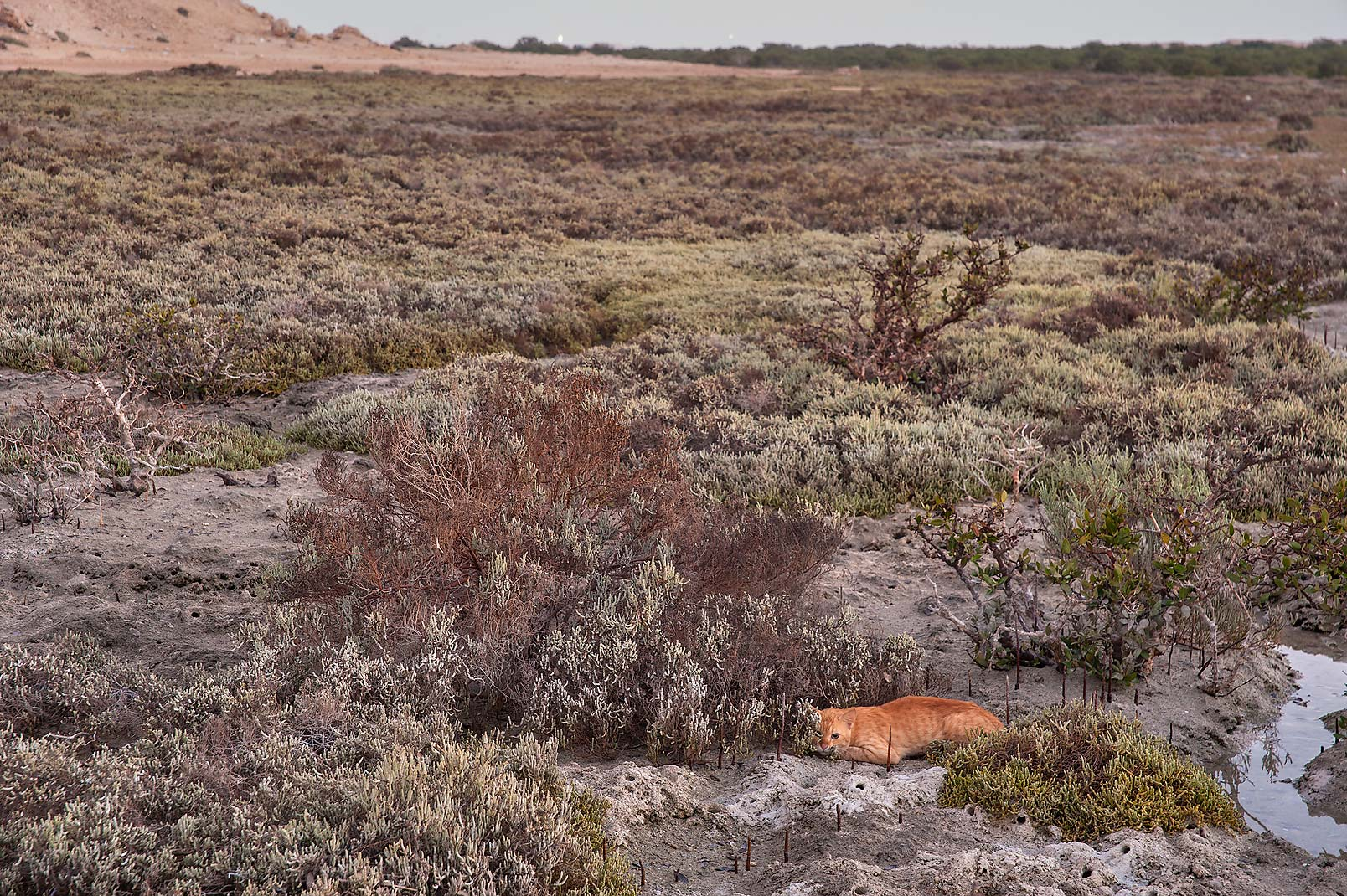
Cat resting in a salt marsh on Al Khor Island.

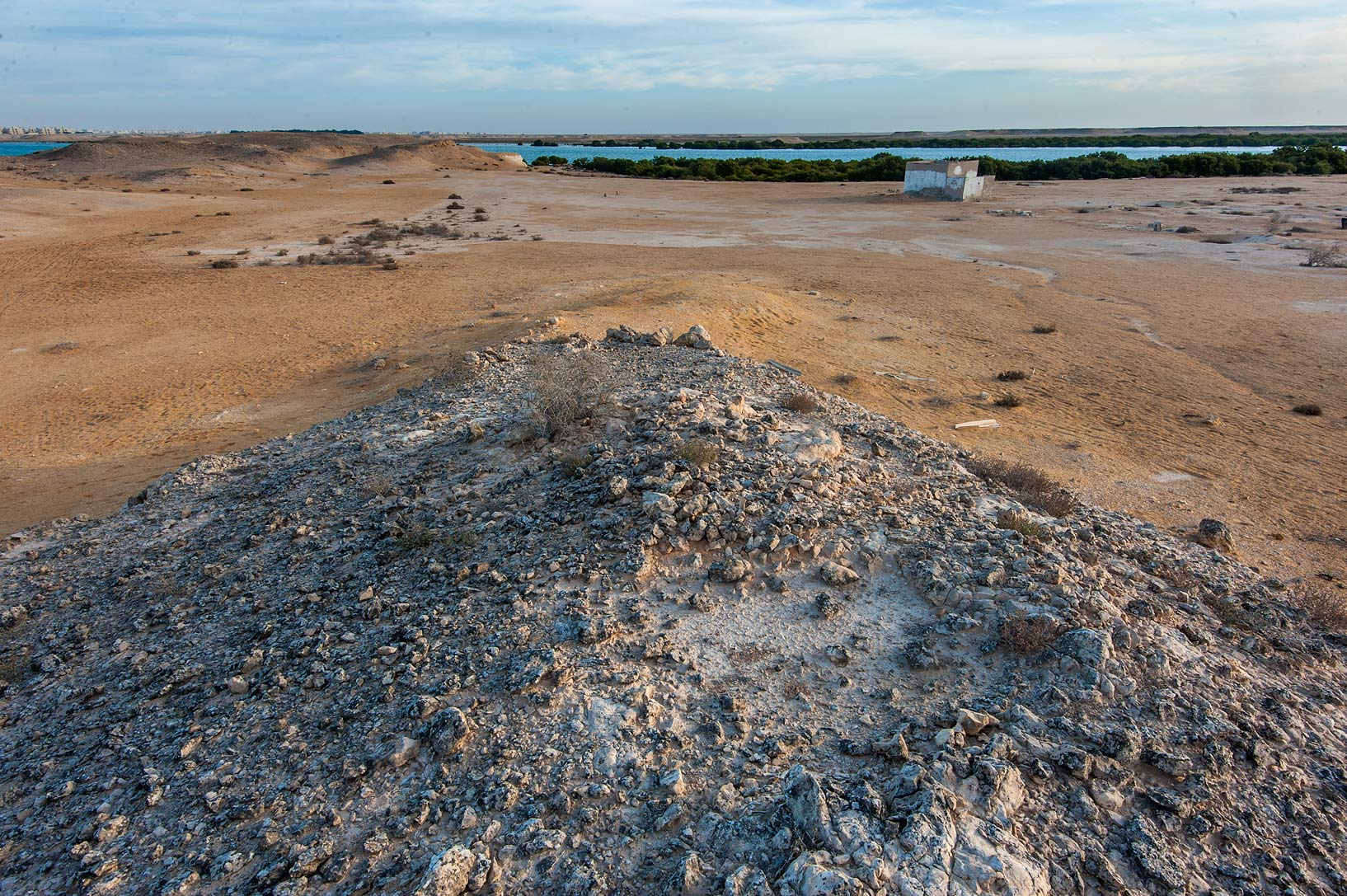
View of Al Khor Island from a hillock.

== See also ==
- List of islands of Qatar
