= Asturian =

Asturian refers to something related to Asturias, in northern Spain:

- Asturians, the people of that region
- Asturian language
- Asturian cuisine, cuisine of the Asturias region of Spain
- Asturian culture of the Epipalaeolithic or Mesolithic Stone Age
- Western Asturian, a dialect of the Asturian language
- Asturcón, also known as an Asturian pony
- An informal name for Westphalian D, an interval of the Carboniferous Period
