= Thaïs Bone =

Upper Palaeolithic engraved bone fragment

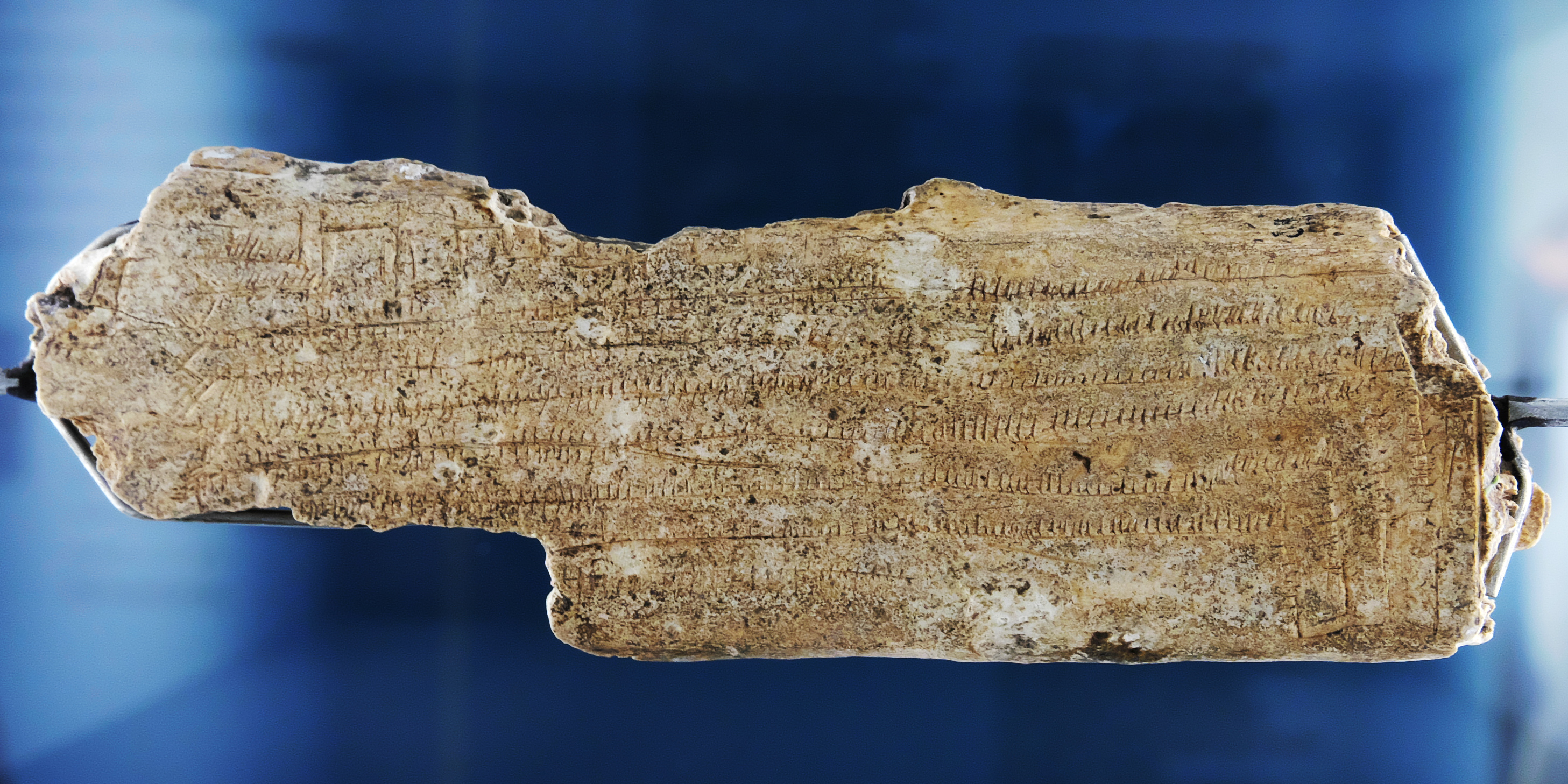
- Material: bone
- Created: c. 12,000 years ago
- Discovered: 1968; Thaïs cave, France
- Present location: Musée de Valence

The Thaïs Bone is an engraved—or notched—bovine rib fragment, discovered in the Thaïs cave (Grotte de Thaïs, variants Thaï/Taïs/Taï) in Saint-Nazaire-en-Royans, Département de la Drôme, France.

The object dates from the end of the last Ice Age - around 12,000 years ago - having been created by people of the early Azilian culture, of the early Mesolithic period (sometimes referred to as Azilian-Epipalaeolithic).

It has been on display at the Musée de Valence since 2006.

== Significance ==
The composition of markings on the Thaïs bone represents the most elaborate time-factored sequence currently known within mobile Palaeolithic art.

In 1991 the American independent scholar Alexander Marshack asserted that the notches were not a decorative representation, but in fact a system for recording time. His analysis of the bone fragment along with a comparative study of one hundred European notched bones was conducted during the 1970s and 80s. He proposed that the engraved notches were divisible into groups of 29 units and therefore corresponded to lunisolar astronomical observations. If true, the Thaïs Bone represents one of humanity's first calendars. Marshack's work has been criticised as an overinterpretation of the evidence offered by the Thaïs Bone.

== Discovery and studies ==
The bone was discovered during excavations carried out in the Thaïs cave, between 1968-69, by two locals from Drôme: Jacques Léopold Brochier, an archaeologist, and his cousin Jacques-Elie Brochier (it was then called the Taï cave). Prior to this a limited exploration of the cave was undertaken in 1878, facilitating access to the water-filled galleries. The Brochiers conducted initial studies on the bone fragment during the early 1970s; analysis continued in stages over the next twenty years, with the substantive analysis and interpretation carried out by Alexander Marshack.

The notched bone artefact was found among the remains of marmots and ibex. It forms part of a large archaeological set of engraved bones and pebbles deposited at the end of the Last Glacial Period (LGP) - during a period of prehistoric fauna and megafauna migration.

== Description and interpretation ==
The Thaïs Bone fragment measures 87mm × 27 mm, and is engraved on both faces.

The composition consists of a boustrophedon sequence of short horizontal containing lines or sections, each of which carries irregular subsets of marks; none of the carvings could have occurred naturally.

The engravings appear not to be decorative, and suggest a complex, cumulative, non-arithmetical notational system of time-reckoning and recording, perhaps based upon daily lunisolar observations carried out over as many as three and a half years.

The shape of the overall pattern suggests that the sequence was kept in step with the seasons by observations of the solstices.

The process of aligning the lunar phase (month) with the seasons of the solar—or tropical—year within lunisolar calendars is called intercalation.

According to a calendrical analysis, the accumulation of notations on the bone therefore represent a form of visual cueing and problem-solving.

The complex nature of the markings, along with their proposed calendrical purposes, carry profound implications for our understanding of European early Mesolithic (Azilian-Epipalaeolithic) culture and touch upon the fields of archaeoastronomy, as well as the histories of art, calendars, and chronometry.

== See also ==
- Archaeoastronomy
- Art of the Upper Palaeolithic
- Azililan
- Chronometry (History)
- History of art
- History of astronomy
- History of calendars
- History of timekeeping devices
- Lunisolar calendar
- Mesolithic
- Prehistoric Art
- Prehistoric Europe
