= Azilian =

Mesolithic industry of the Franco-Cantabrian region

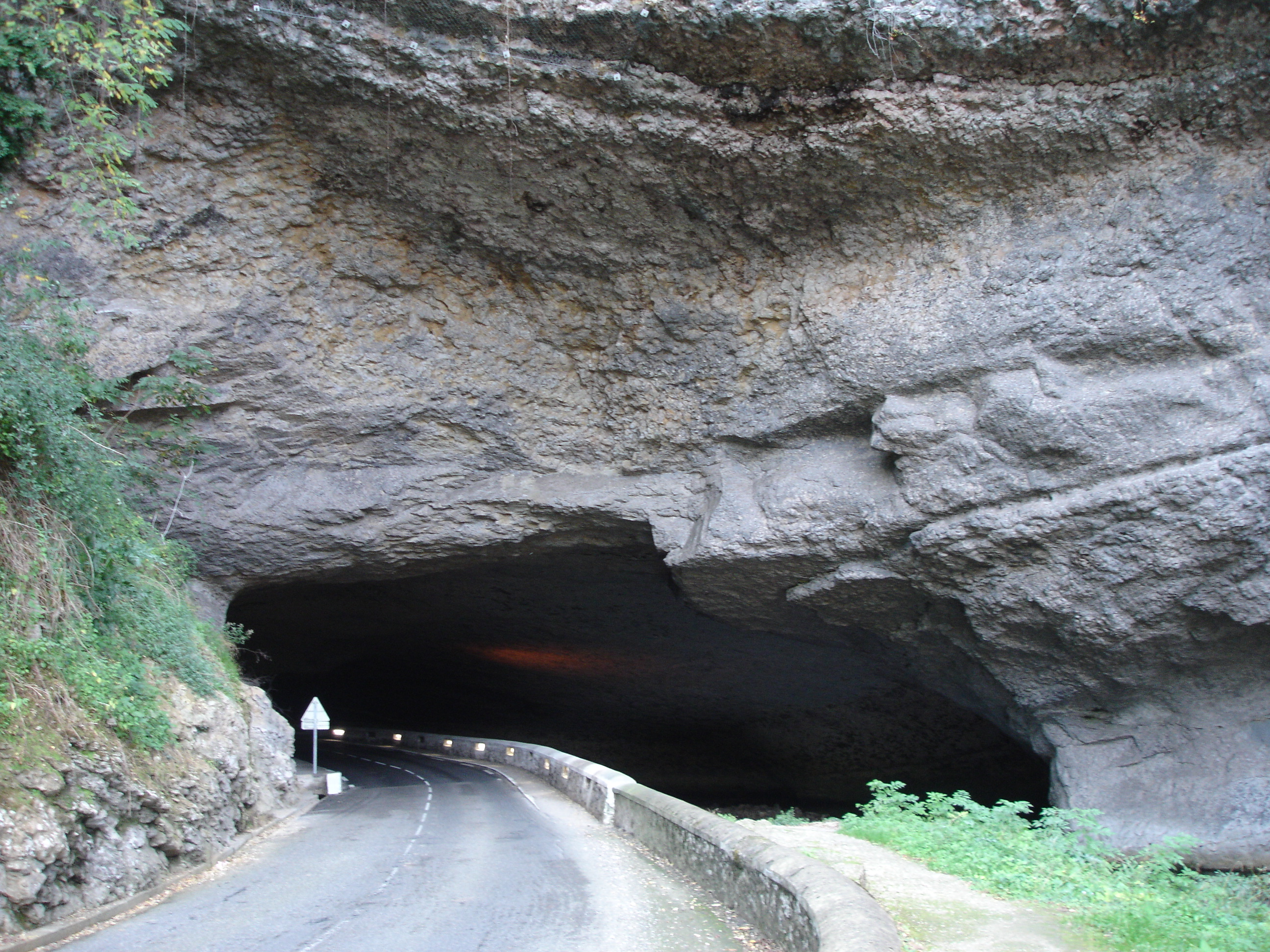
- Geographical range: Western Europe
- Period: Epipaleolithic or Mesolithic
- Dates: 12,500–10,000 BP
- Type site: Le Mas-d'Azil
- Preceded by: Magdalenian
- Followed by: Maglemosian culture, Sauveterrian

The Azilian is a Mesolithic industry of the Franco-Cantabrian region of northern Spain and Southern France. It dates approximately 10,000–12,500 years ago. Diagnostic artifacts from the culture include projectile points (microliths with rounded retouched backs), crude flat bone harpoons and pebbles with abstract decoration. The latter were first found in the River Arize at the type-site for the culture, the Grotte du Mas d'Azil at Le Mas-d'Azil in the French Pyrenees (illustrated, now with a modern road running through it). These are the main type of Azilian art, showing a great reduction in scale and complexity from the Magdalenian Art of the Upper Palaeolithic.

The industry can be classified as part of the Epipaleolithic or the Mesolithic periods, or of both. Archaeologists think the Azilian represents the tail end of the Magdalenian as the warming climate brought about changes in human behaviour in the area. The effects of melting ice sheets would have diminished the food supply and probably impoverished the previously well-fed Magdalenian manufacturers, or at least those who had not followed the herds of horse and reindeer out of the glacial refugium to new territory. As a result, Azilian tools and art were cruder and less expansive than their Ice Age predecessors - or simply different.

People associated with the Azilian are genetically different from the preceding Magdalenian peoples, instead being related to peoples from who produced the Epigravettian culture as part of the Villabruna/Western Hunter Gatherer ancestry cluster, though with some ancestry from the preceding Magdalenian peoples.

== Terminology ==
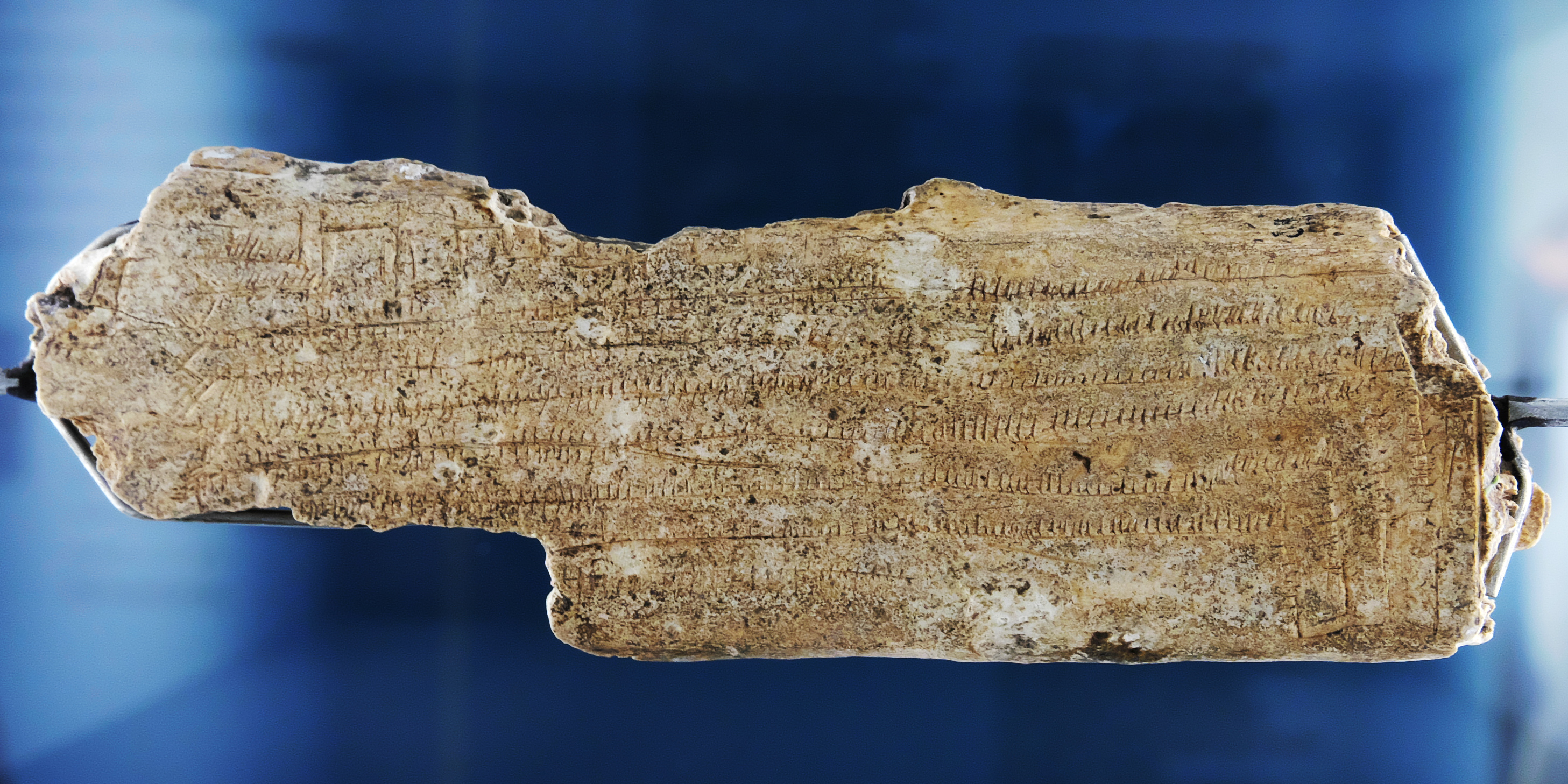
The Thaïs Bone, c. 12,000 BP.

The Azilian was named by Édouard Piette, who excavated the Mas d'Azil type-site in 1887. Unlike other coinages by Piette, the name was generally accepted, indeed in the early 20th century used for much greater areas than it is today. Henry Fairfield Osborn, president of the American Museum of Natural History and a palaeontologist rather than an archaeologist, was taken around the sites by leading excavators such as Hugo Obermaier. The popularizing book he published in 1916, Men of the Old Stone Age, talks happily of Azilian sites as far north as Oban in Scotland, wherever flattened barbed "harpoon" points of deer antler are found.

Subsequently, Azilian types of artefact have been defined more precisely, and similar examples from beyond the Franco-Cantabrian region generally excluded and reassigned, although references to "Azilian" finds much further north than the Franco-Cantabrian region still appear in non-specialized sources. Terms like "Azilian-like" and even "epi-Azilian" may be used to describe such finds.

== Characteristics ==
The Azilian in Vasco-Cantabria occupied a similar region to the Magdalenian, and in very many cases the same sites; typically the Azilian remains are fewer, and rather simpler, than those from the Magdalenian occupation beneath, indicative of a smaller group of people. As the glaciers retreated, sites increasingly reach into the slopes of the Cantabrian Mountains as high as 1,000 metres above sea level, though presumably the higher ones were only occupied in the summers. The grand cavern at Mas d'Azil is not entirely typical of Azilian sites, many of which are shallow shelters at the bottom of a rock face.

=== Azilian pebbles ===
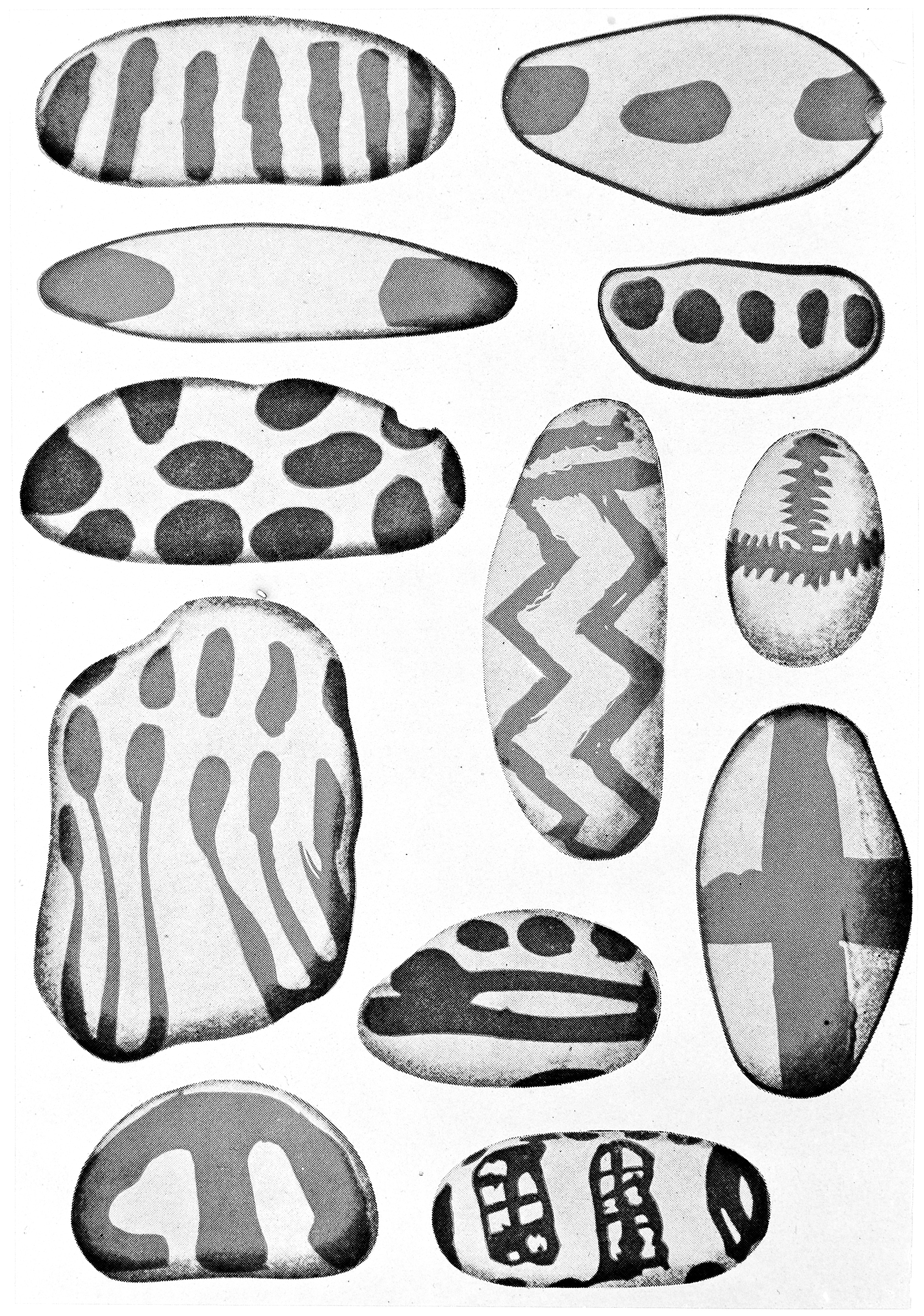
Azilian painted pebbles from the cave of Le Mas d'Azil.

Painted, and sometimes engraved pebbles (or "cobbles") are a feature of core Azilian sites; some 37 sites have produced them. The decoration is simple patterns of dots, zig-zags, and stripes, with some crosses or hatching, normally just on one side of the pebble, which is usually thin and flattish, and some 4 to 10 cm across. Large numbers may be found at a site. The colours are usually red from iron oxide, or sometimes black; the paint was often mixed in Pecten saltwater scallop shells, even at Mas d'Azil, which is far from the sea. Attempts to find a meaning for their iconography have not got very far, although "the repeated combinations of motifs does seem to some extent to be ordered, which may suggest a simple syntax". Such attempts began with Piette, who believed the pebbles carried a primitive writing system.

== Neighbours ==
The Azilian culture coexisted with similar early Mesolithic European cultures, such as the Federmesser in northern Europe, the Tjongerian in the Low Countries, the Romanellian culture of Italy, the Creswellian in Britain and the Clisurian in Romania (in a process called azilianization).

In its late phase, it experienced strong influences from the neighbouring Tardenoisian, reflected in the presence of many geometrical microliths. The Azilian culture persisted until the arrival of the Neolithic Era. The Asturian culture in the area to the west along the coast was also similar, but added a distinctive form of pick-axe to its toolkit.

== Gallery ==
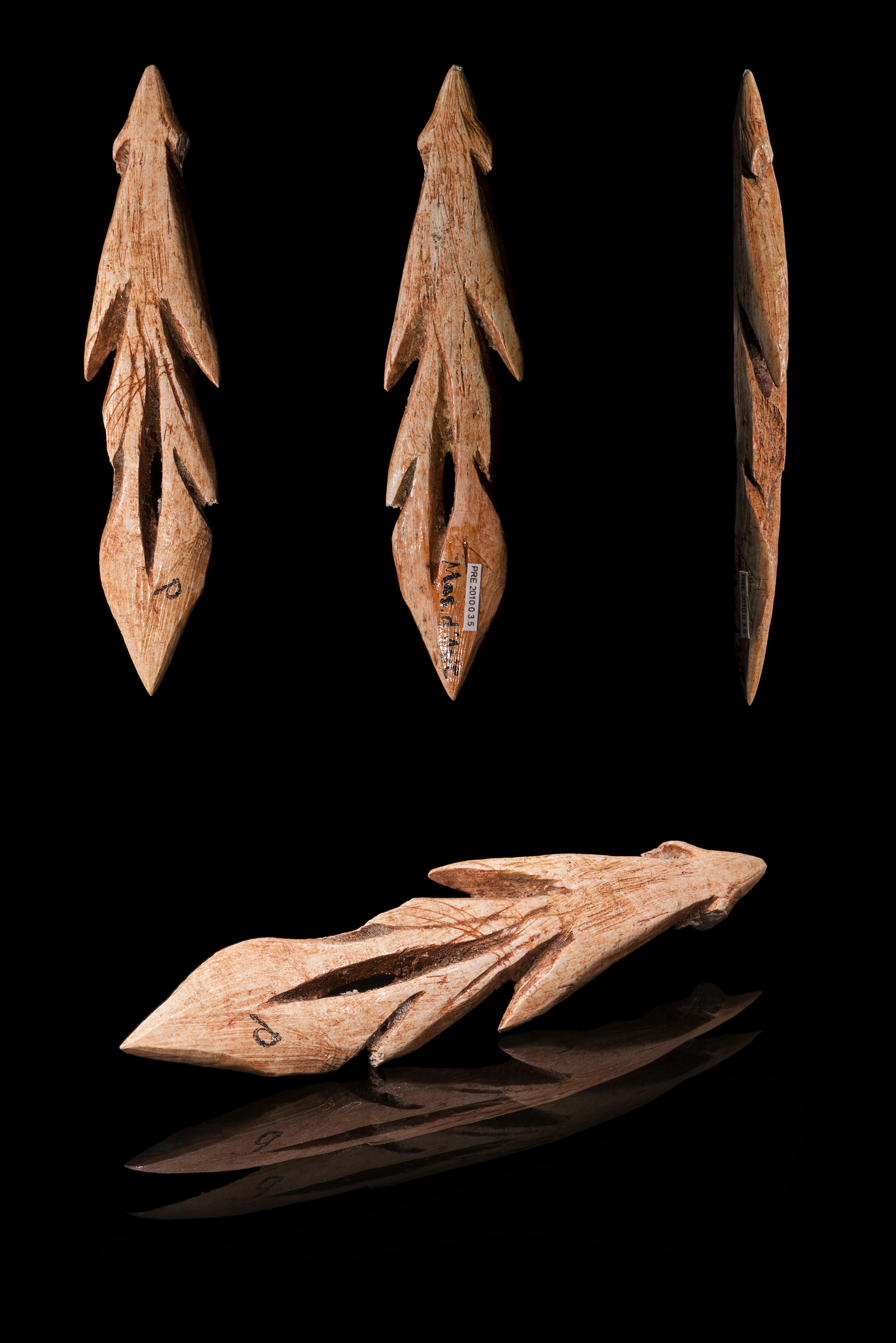
Harpoon – Mas d'Azil – Museum de Toulouse

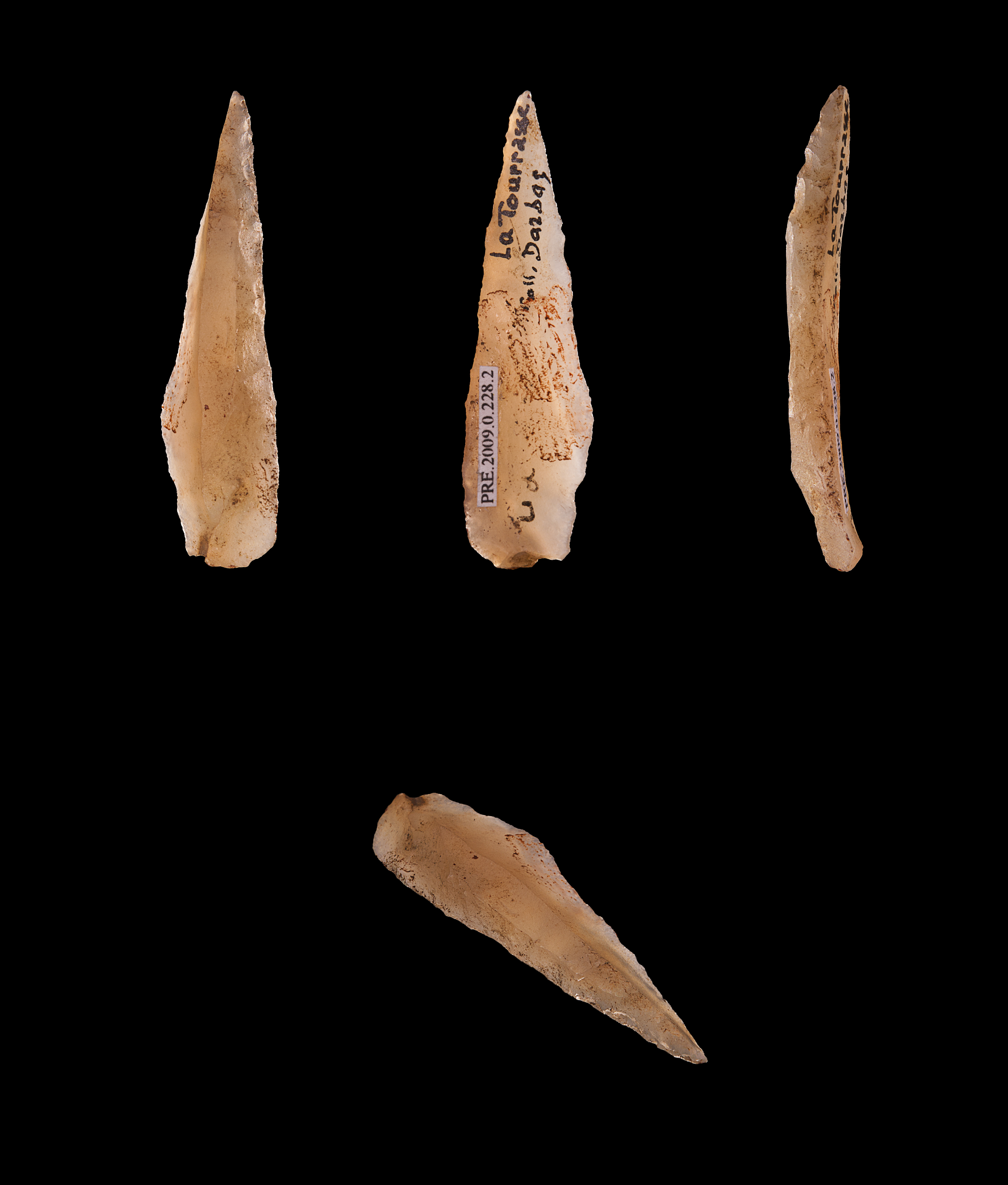
Azilian point - Tourasse Cave – Museum de Toulouse

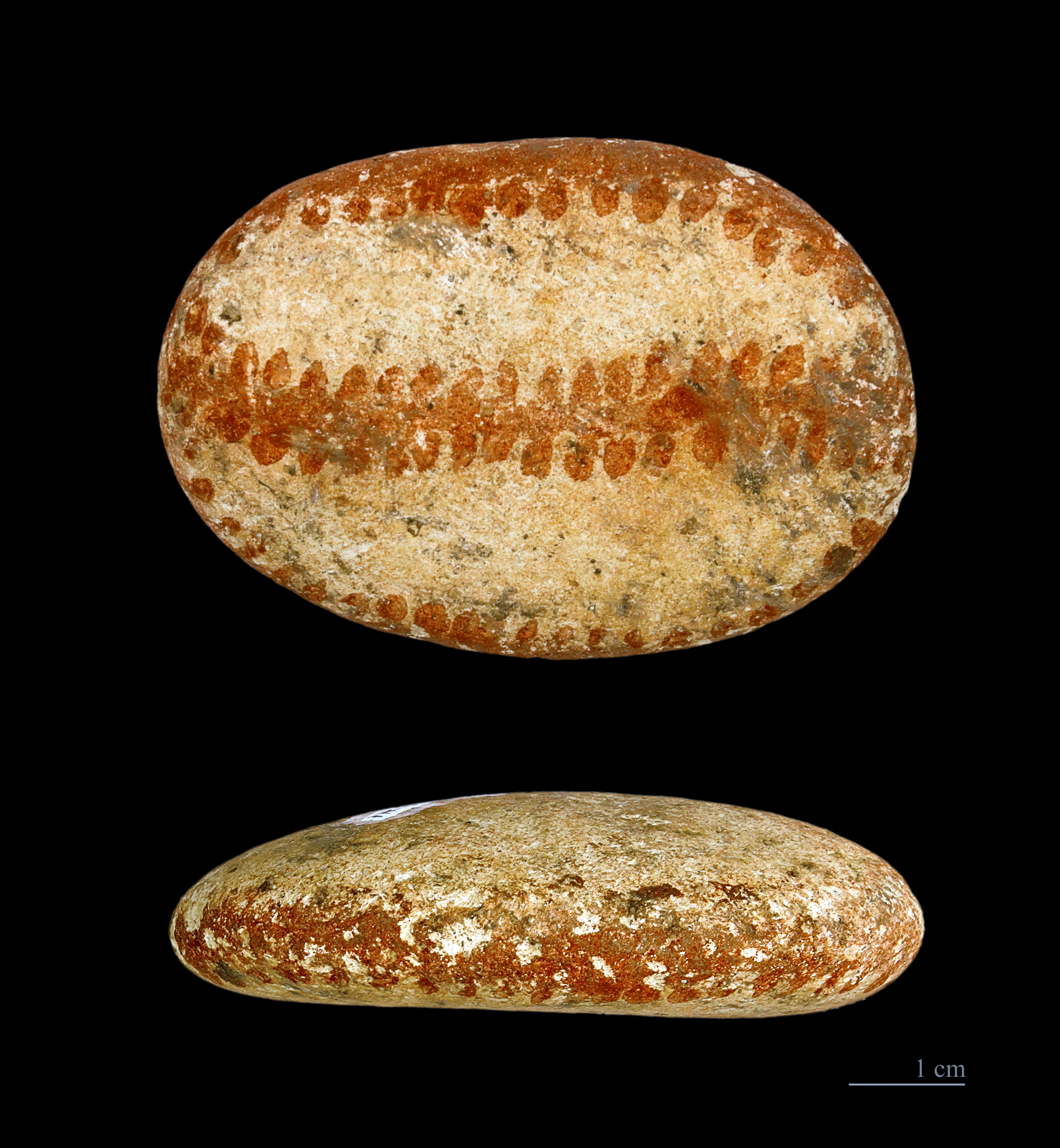
Painted pebble – Mas d'Azil – Museum de Toulouse

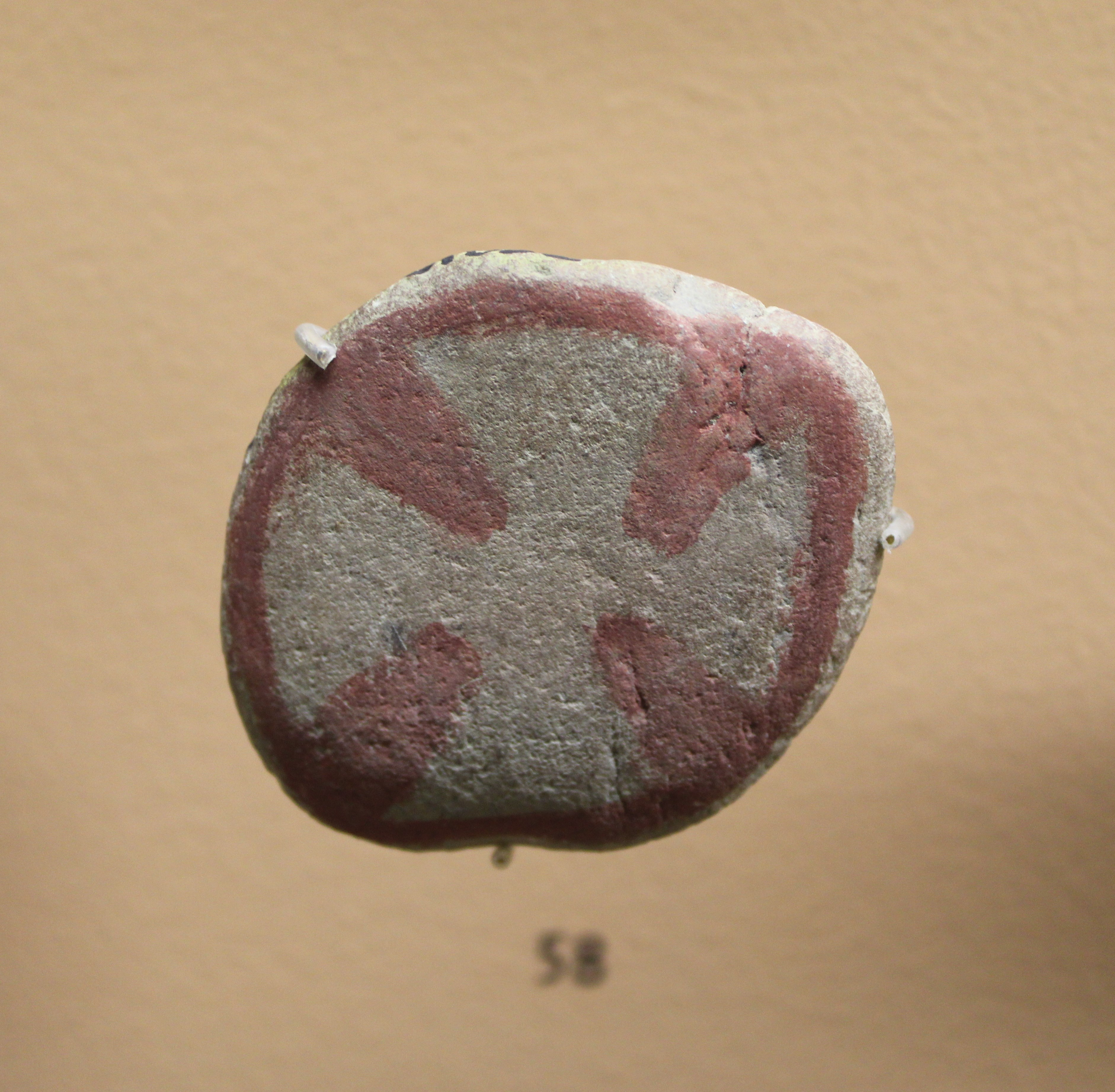

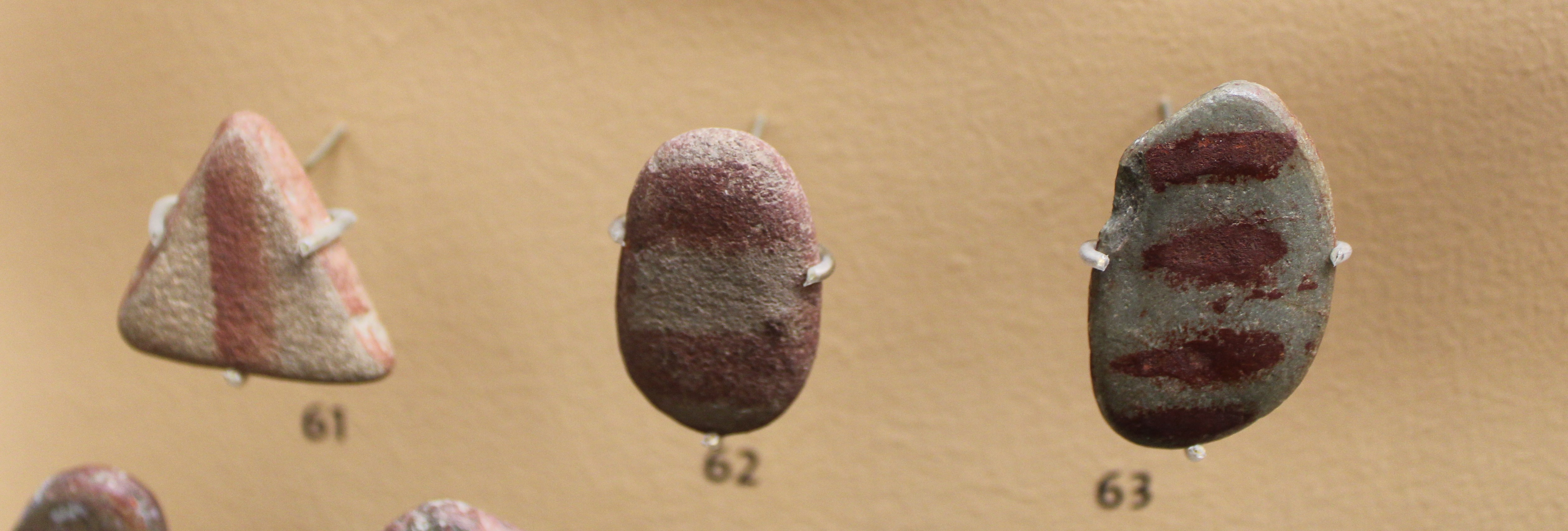

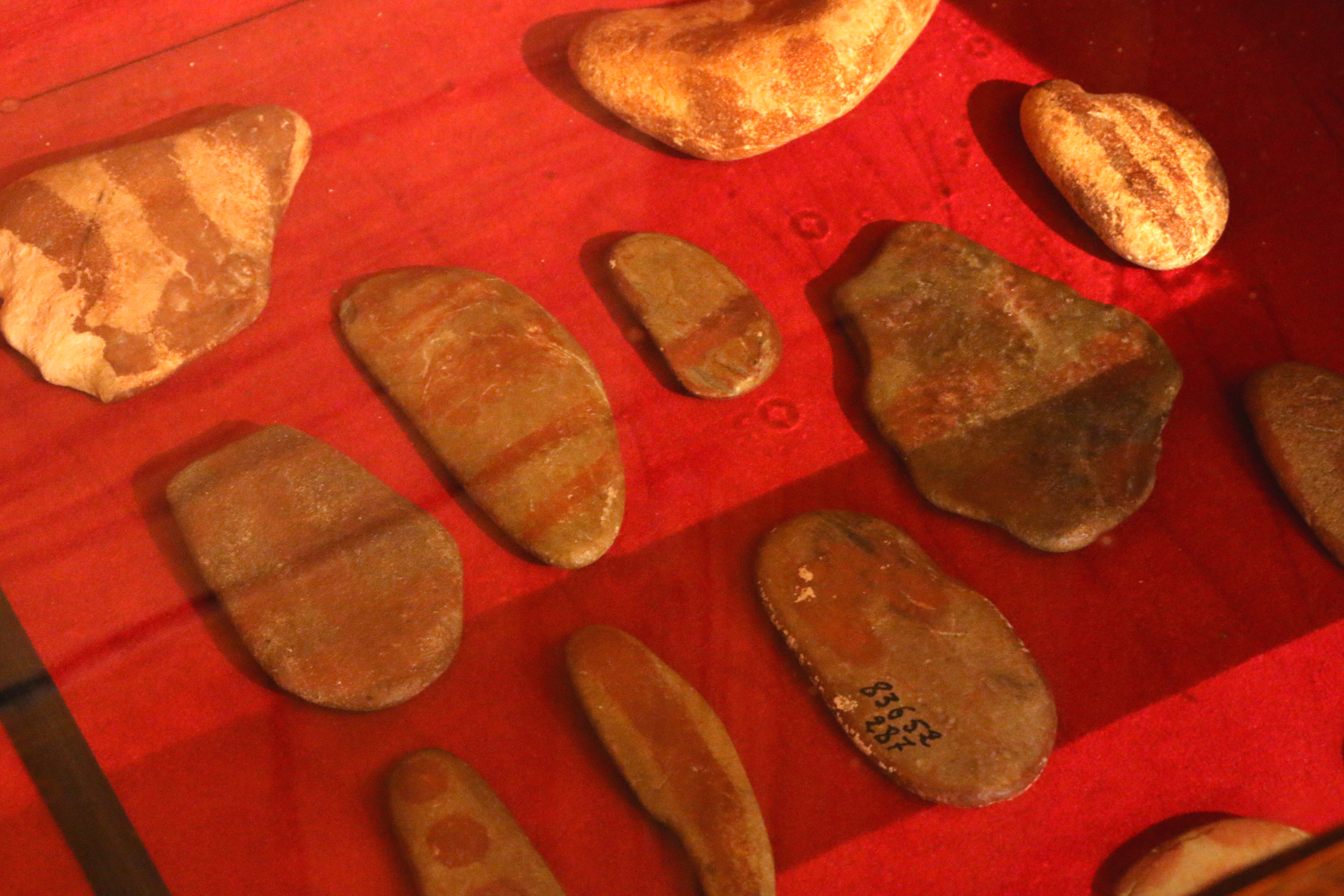

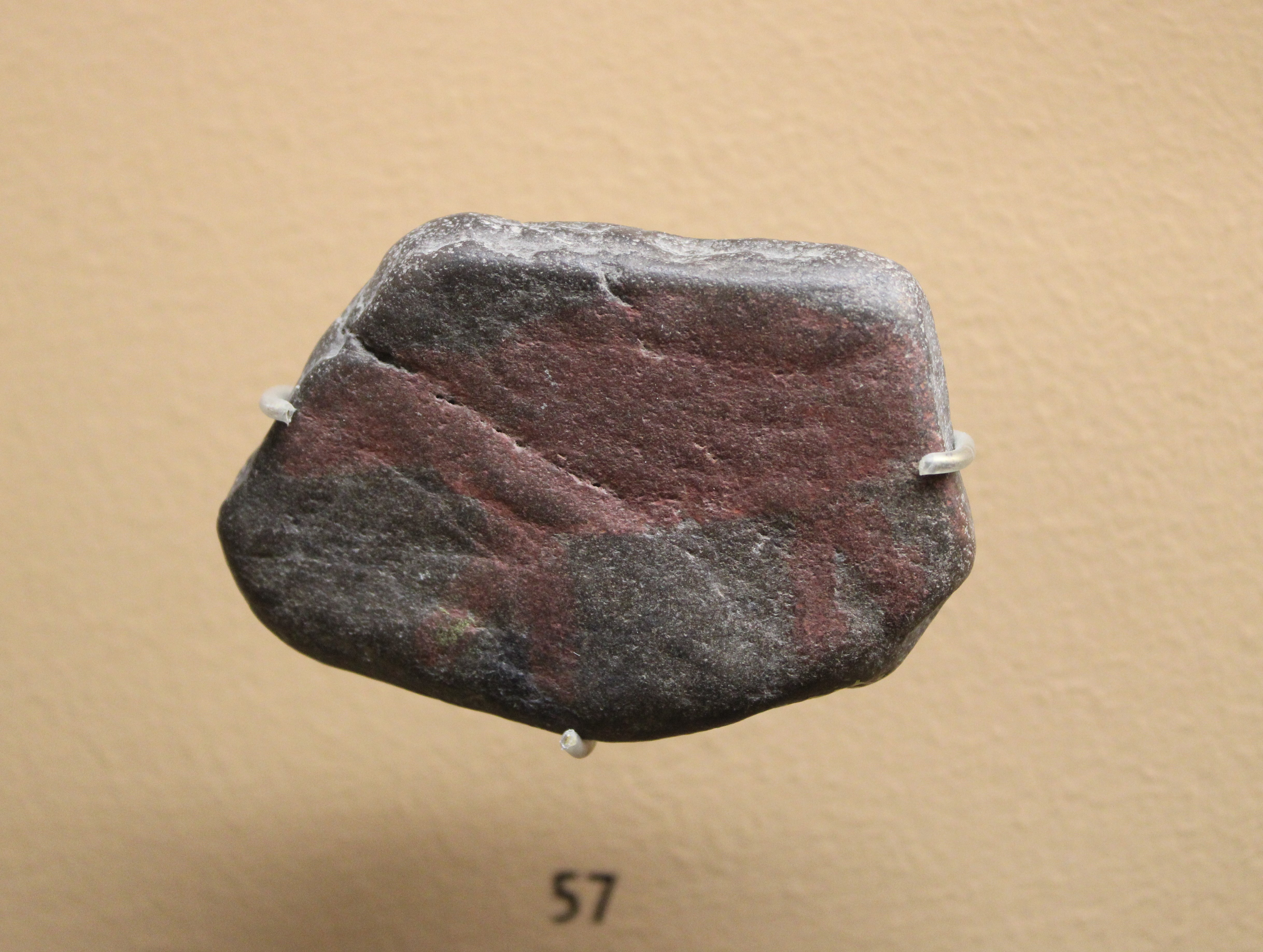

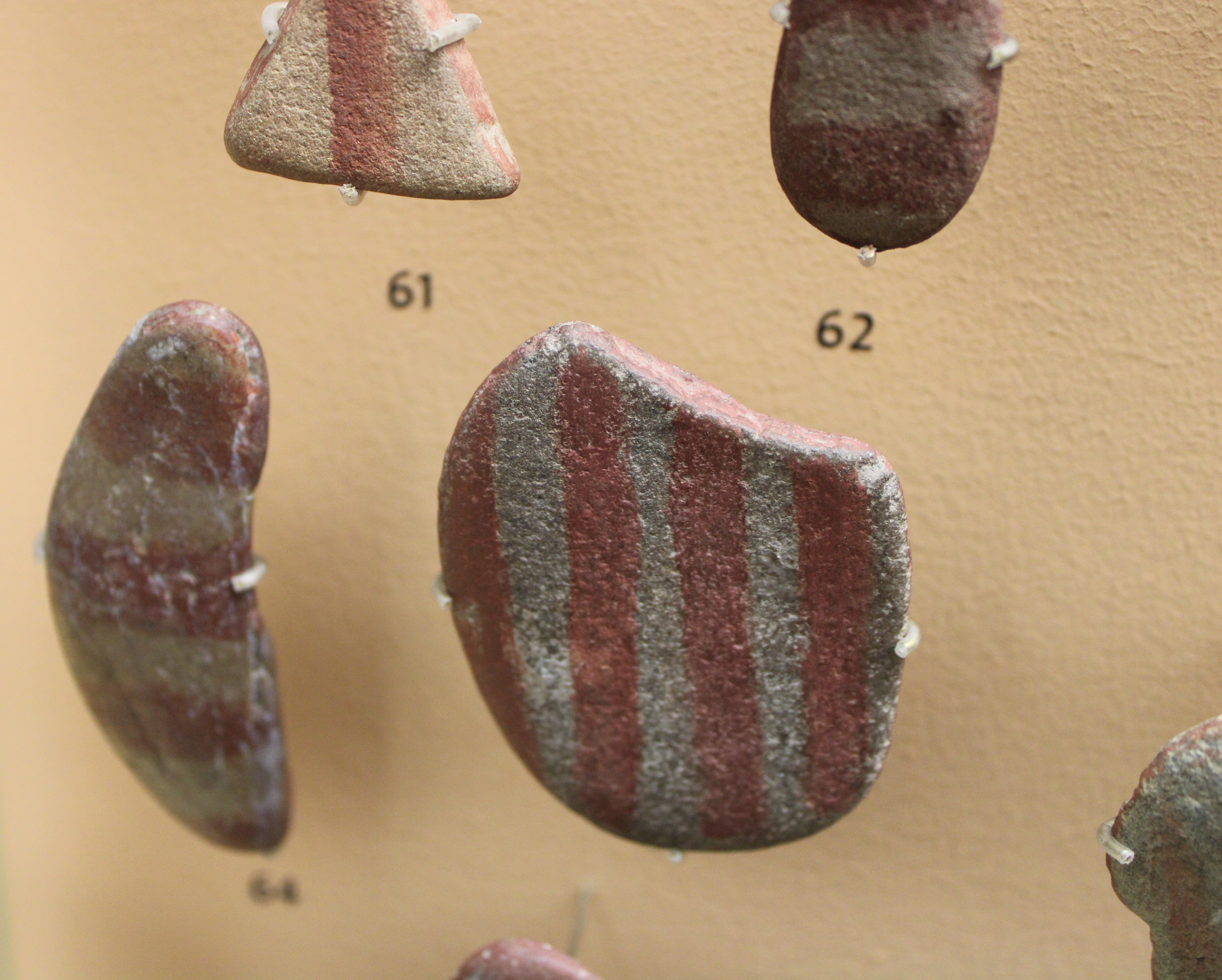

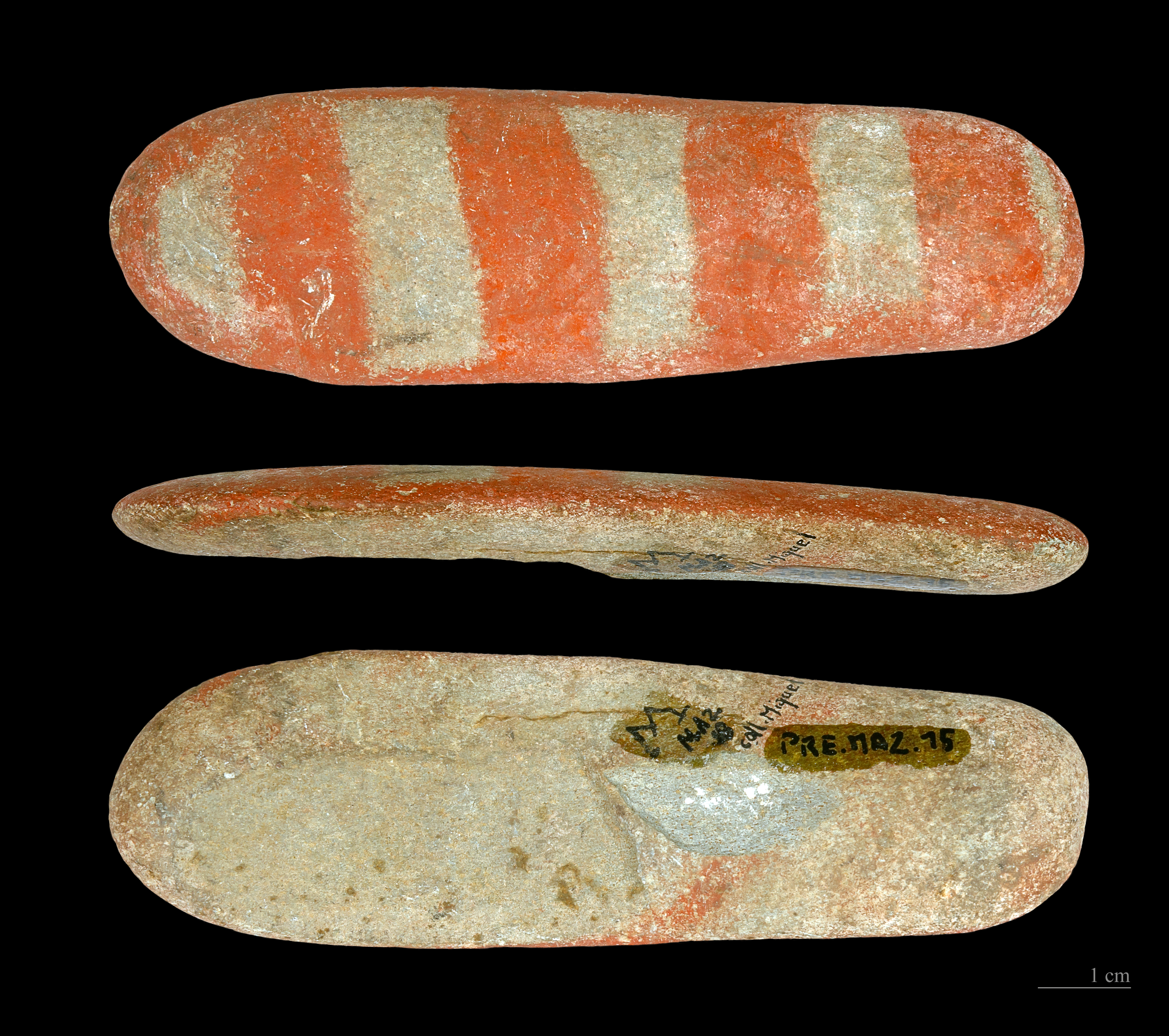

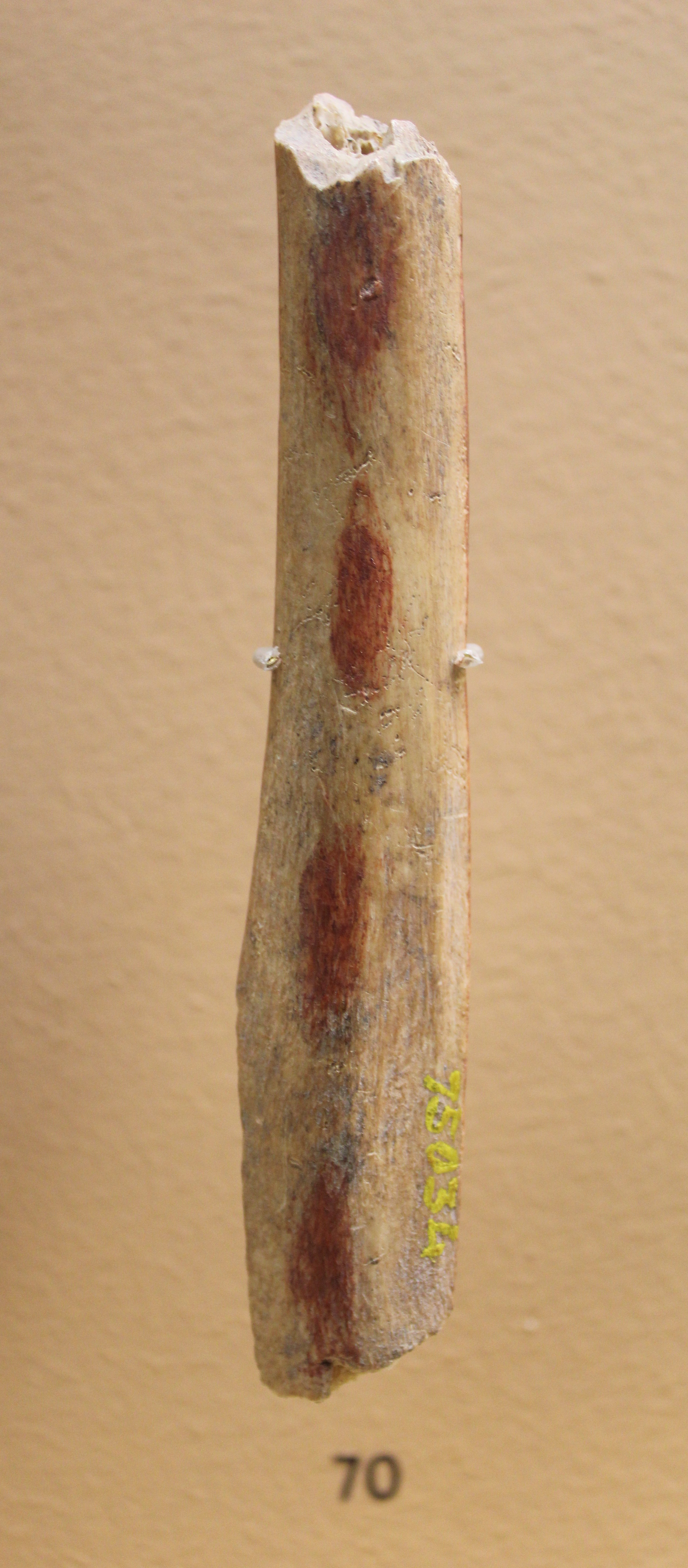

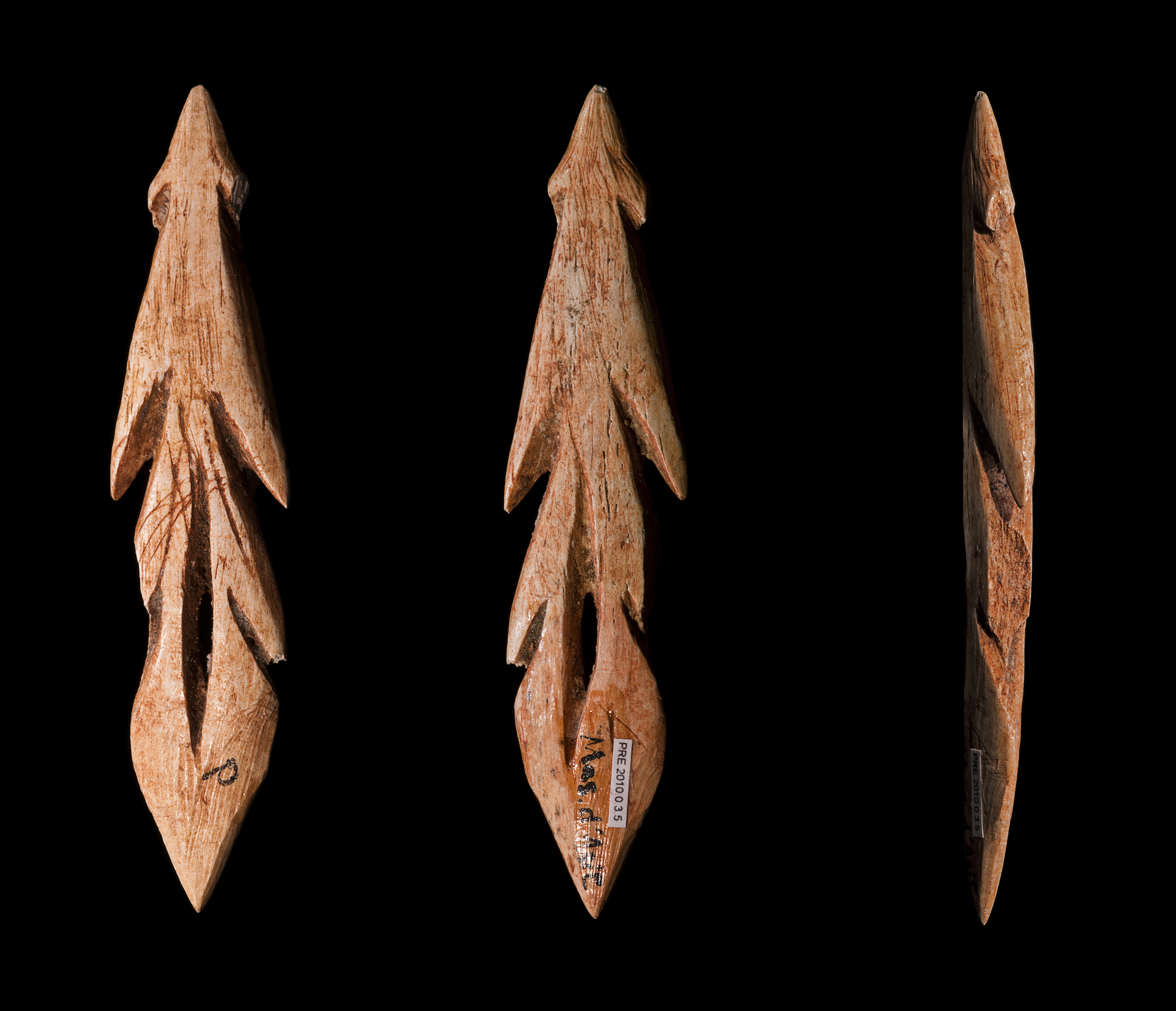

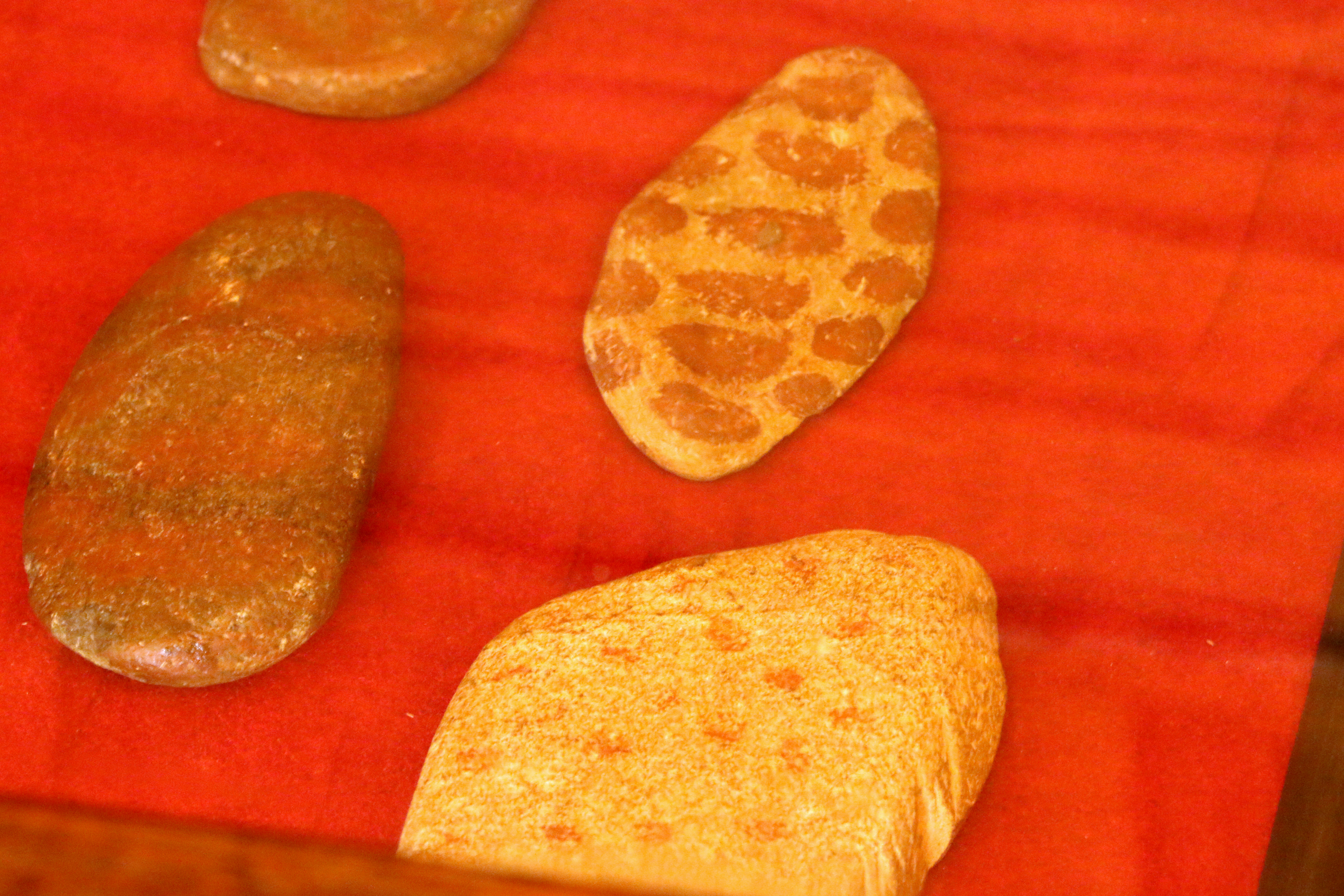

== In Southern Iberia ==
A culture very similar to the Azilian spread as well into Mediterranean Spain and southern Portugal. Because it lacked bone industry it is named distinctively as Iberian microlaminar microlithism. It was replaced by the so-called geometrical microlithism related to Sauveterrian culture.

== Genetics ==
In a genetic study published in 2014, the remains of an Azilian male from the Grotte du Bichon were examined. He was found to be carrying the paternal haplogroup I2 and the maternal haplogroup U5b1h.

Villalba-Mouco et al examined the remains of two males of the Azilian culture buried at the Late Upper Paleolithic site of Balma de Guilanyà, Catalonia, Spain c. 11,380-9,990 BC. They were found to be carrying the paternal haplogroups I and C1a1a, and the maternal haplogroups U5b2a and U2'3'4'7'8'9. They consisted of a mixture of ancestry between people from the preceding Magdalenian culture, as well as Villabruna/Western Hunter-Gatherer cluster, which shares affinities to people from the Middle East and Caucasus.

== See also ==
- Art of the Upper Palaeolithic
- Federmesser
- Prehistoric Art
- Prehistoric Europe
- Prehistoric France
- Prehistoric Iberia
- Sauveterrian
