= Le Mas-d'Azil =

Commune in Occitanie, France

- Commune
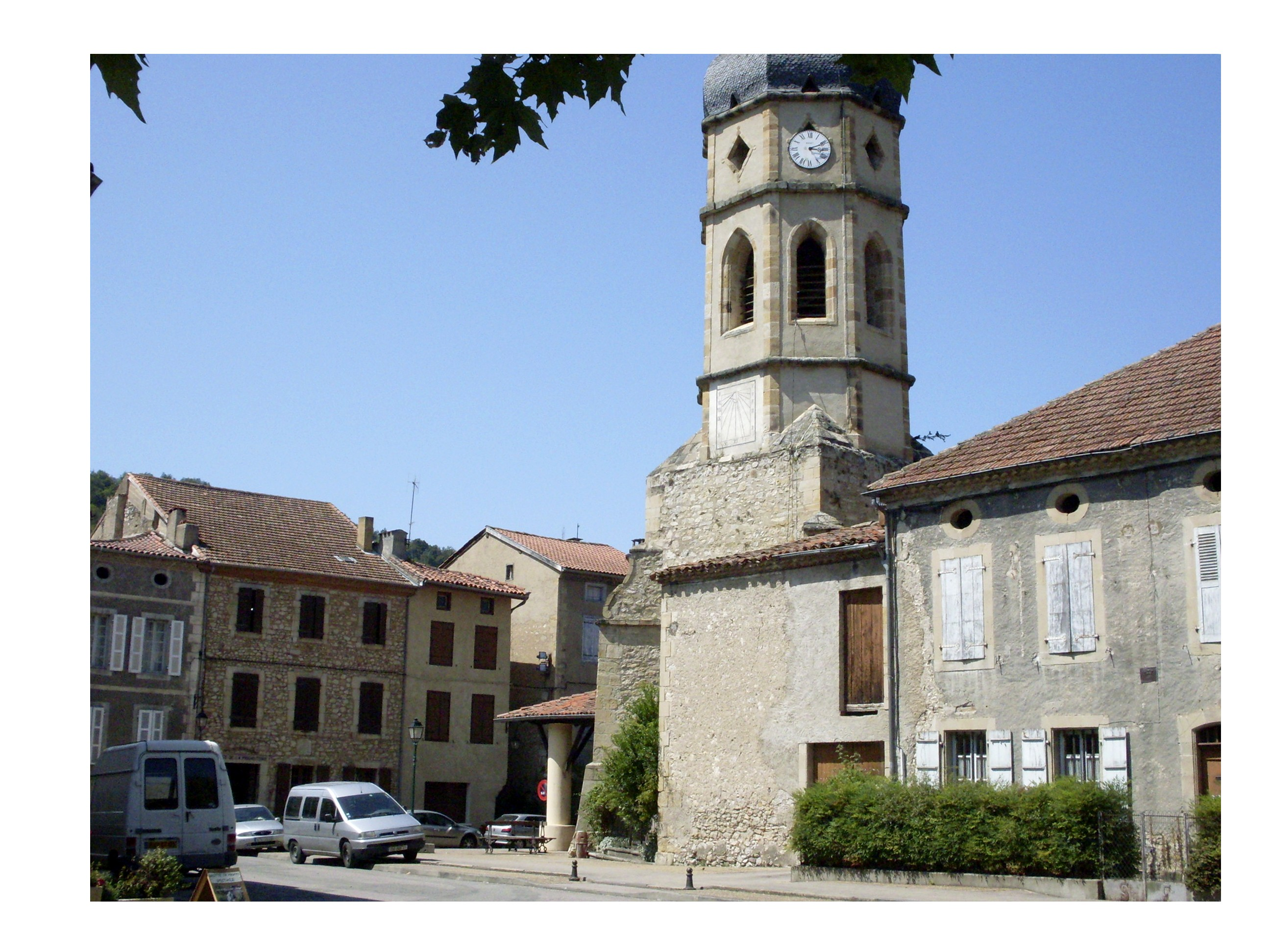
- The church of Saint-Etienne

- Coat of arms
- Location of Le Mas-d'Azil
- Location within France Location within Occitanie
- Coordinates: 43°04′54″N 1°21′41″E
- Country: France
- Region: Occitania
- Department: Ariège
- Arrondissement: Saint-Girons
- Canton: Arize-Lèze

Government
  - Mayor (2020–2026): Raymond Berdou
- Area^{1}: 39.36 km^{2} (15.20 sq mi)
- Elevation: 320 m (1,050 ft)
- Highest elevation: 580 m (1,900 ft)
- Lowest elevation: 275 m (902 ft)
- Population (2023): 1,237
  - Density: 31.43/km^{2} (81.40/sq mi)
- Time zone: UTC+01:00 (CET)
  - Summer (DST): UTC+02:00 (CEST)
- INSEE/Postal code: 09181 /09290
- ^{1} French Land Register data, which excludes lakes, ponds, glaciers > 1 km^{2} (0.386 sq mi or 247 acres) and river estuaries.

Le Mas-d'Azil (French pronunciation: [lə mas dazil]; Occitan: Lo Mas d'Asilh) is a commune in the Ariège department in southwestern France, containing a cave that is the typesite for the prehistoric Azilian culture. The Grotte du Mas d'Azil (sometimes hyphenated, sometimes not) is a "supersite" with rich remains of human usage from about 30,000 years ago, and is also a key site for the preceding Magdalenian culture. The D119 road runs right through the large cave, which is a natural tunnel 420 metres long and 50 metres high.

== Population ==
Historical population
Year	Pop.	±% p.a.
1968	1,682	—
1975	1,568	−1.00%
1982	1,404	−1.57%
1990	1,307	−0.89%
1999	1,117	−1.73%
2007	1,226	+1.17%
2012	1,199	−0.44%
2017	1,166	−0.56%
2023	1,237	+0.99%
Source: INSEE

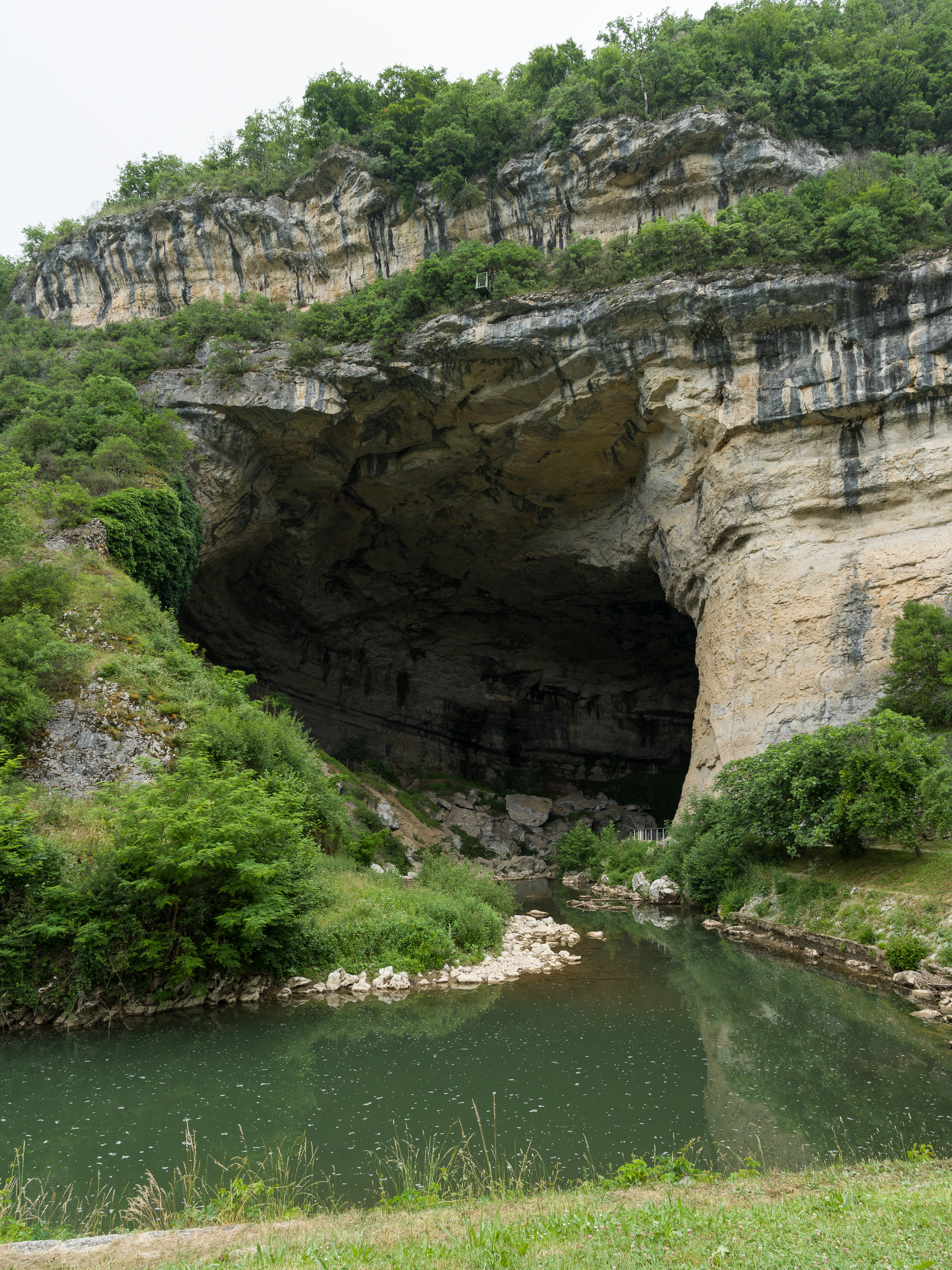
Entrance of the Grotte du Mas-d'Azil

== See also ==
- Communes of the Ariège department
