= Mas d'Azil Cave =

Cave in France

Coordinates: 43.0694°N 1.3554°E

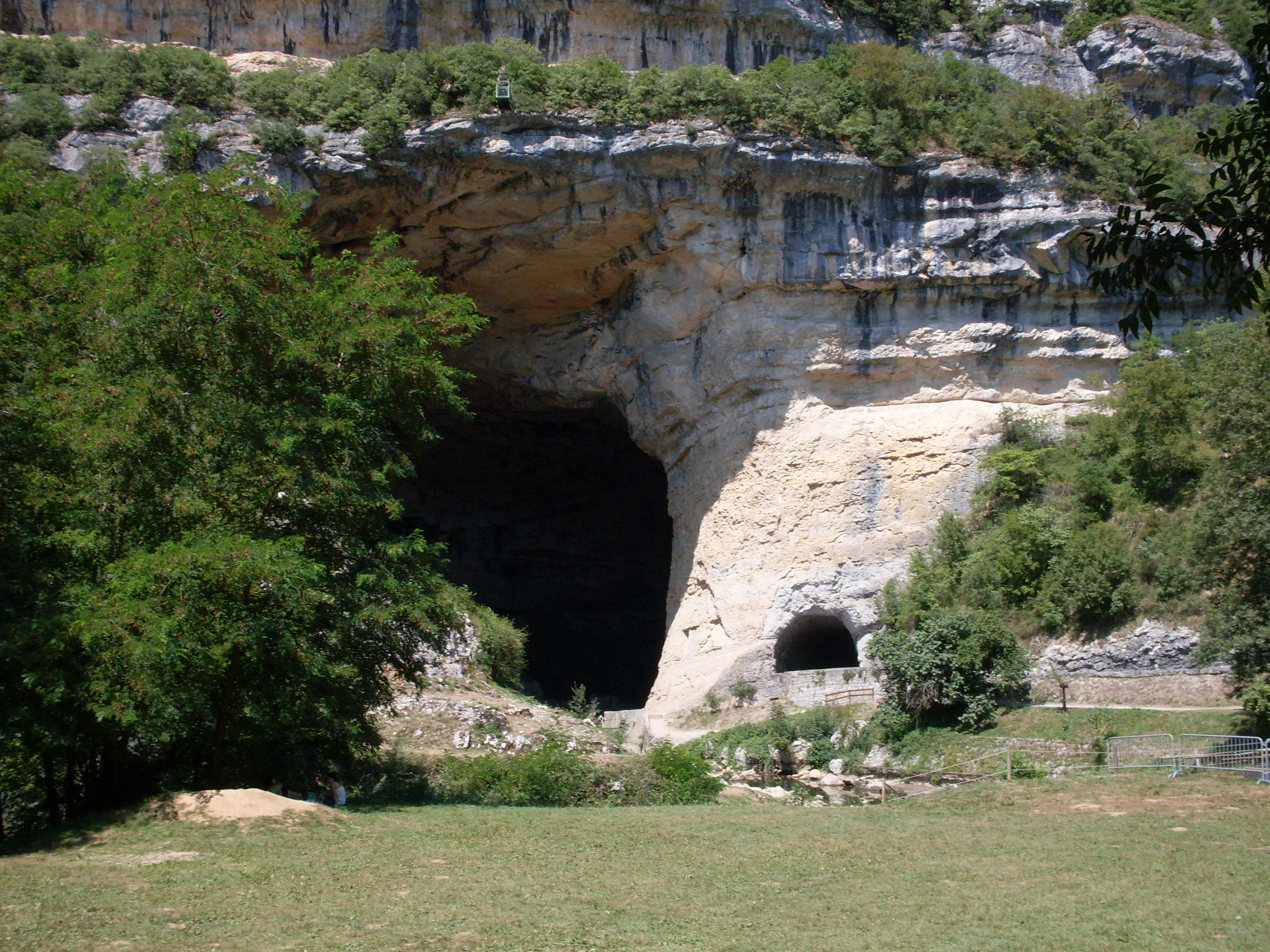
Cave entrance

The Mas d'Azil Cave (French: Grotte du Mas-d'Azil) is a cave located in the French commune of Mas-d'Azil, in the department of Ariège in Occitania.

The cave was occupied during various prehistoric periods and gave its name to a Mesolithic industry, the Azilian. It is also one of the few caves in the world through which cars can travel.

== Location ==
The cave is located on the right bank of the Arize river and is 1 km south of the village of Mas-d'Azil, in the western part of the Ariège department. Saint-Girons (the department's subprefecture) is 25 km to the south-west and Foix (the prefecture) is 30 km to the south-east.

== Prehistory ==
=== Occupation ===
Multiple prehistoric groups settled in the cave. The remains include the Faon aux oiseaux (Fawn with Birds), a spear thrower dated to the Middle Magdalenian (15,000 to 13,500 years BP), the Coco des roseaux, a Magdalenian hunting scene with a rudimentary human figure, engraved on a fragment of an animal shoulder blade, as well as a young girl's skull, "Magda" (15,000 years old) with two carved bone plates simulating eyes in the orbits.

The cave also contains several decorated galleries, such as the Breuil gallery or the Reindeer gallery, in which representations of bison, fish, horse hindquarters, ibex head, human face, etc. can be found.

In 1992, a total of nine human representations were recorded in the cave.

The cave gave its name to the Azilian, a prehistoric culture of the Epipaleolithic (around 12,000 to 9,500 years BP) between the Magdalenian and the Mesolithic. There is a microlithic industry, with flat harpoons and many painted pebbles (with red ochre dating back 10,000 years).

In the Neolithic period (5,000 to 2,500 BP), many dolmens were erected in and around the village. Pottery, included from the Gauls, was also found in the cave.

=== Archaeological excavations ===
The road within the cave was constructed based on a 1857 plan. The excavation work caused the deplacement of sediment, and archaeological remains then appear on the right bank in the area.

For almost 40 years (between the end of the 1840s and the 1880s), geologist Jean-Jacques Pouech studied the cave. He mainly looked for fossil bones and topographed the area. Doctor Félix Garrigou also visited the cave in 1862 and published an article in 1867. After the flood of the Arize in 1875, new excavations were organized by Félix Régnault and Tibulle Ladevèze. From 1887 to 1894, Édouard Piette explored the cave, established a prehistoric chronology based on the evolution of artistic productions and introduced the term of Azilian. One room bears his name today. In 1901 and 1902, Henri Breuil studied parietal art.

Research resumed in the middle of the 20th century by Marthe and Saint-Just Péquart. In 1937, they explored the Silex gallery and discovered one of the most important Magdalenian habitats in the Pyrenees. They discovered objects there such as the Faon aux oiseaux (in 1940) and the pierced stick with a horse protome. From the mid-1930s to 1950s, Joseph Mandement and his wife explored the right bank of the cave by unblocking and clearing new galleries and cavities. They found, among others, the Bear gallery (Gallerie de l'ours) and the skull called "Magda" in 1948.

André Alteirac conducted a series of excavations and studies during the 1960s and 1970s. In 1977, he invited Denis Vialou, a member of the National Museum of Natural History, to study the parietal art of the "Breuil Gallery". He also created the Museum of Prehistory in 1981.

In the 1980s, François Rouzaud, an archaeologist and speleologist, produced a plan of the cave for the Ministry of Culture, which was never published.

From 2011 to 2013, new developments were carried out, including the construction of an interpretation centre to welcome the public. During a preventive excavation carried out by the Inrap (French national Institute for Preventive Archeological Researsh), dwellings from 35,000 years BP, from the Aurignacian period, were discovered.

A team of researchers from the University of Toulouse-Jean Jaurès has been working in the cave since 2013. They are carrying out a major general inventory of the cave and the entire massif. Several lines of research are being developed around cartography, geology and archaeology.

=== Some objects found in the cave ===
==== Spear-thrower titled "Fawn with birds" (Faon aux oiseaux) ====
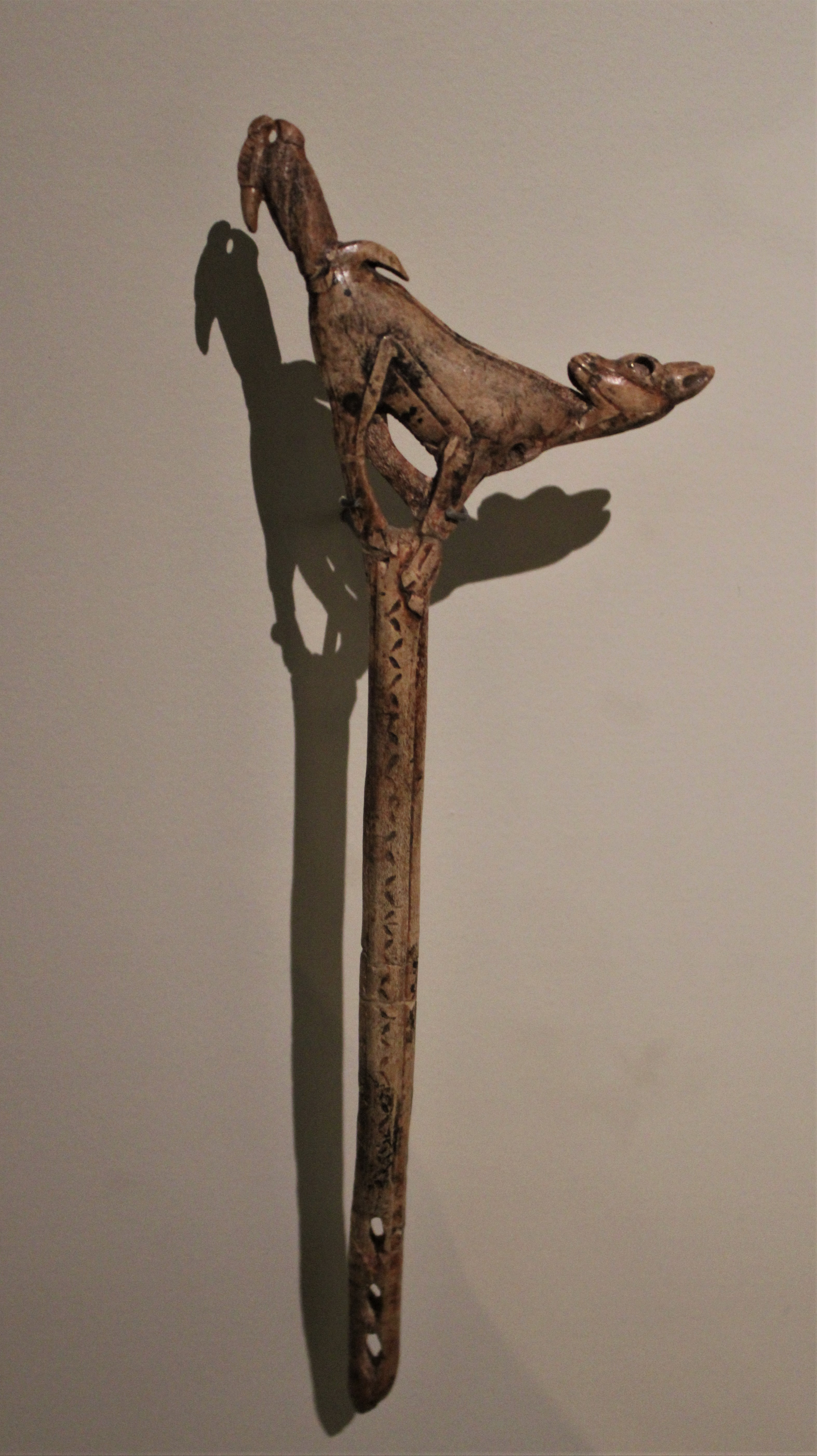
Full view of the spear-thrower

Part view of the spear-thrower

Detail of the spear-thrower

==== Other carvings ====
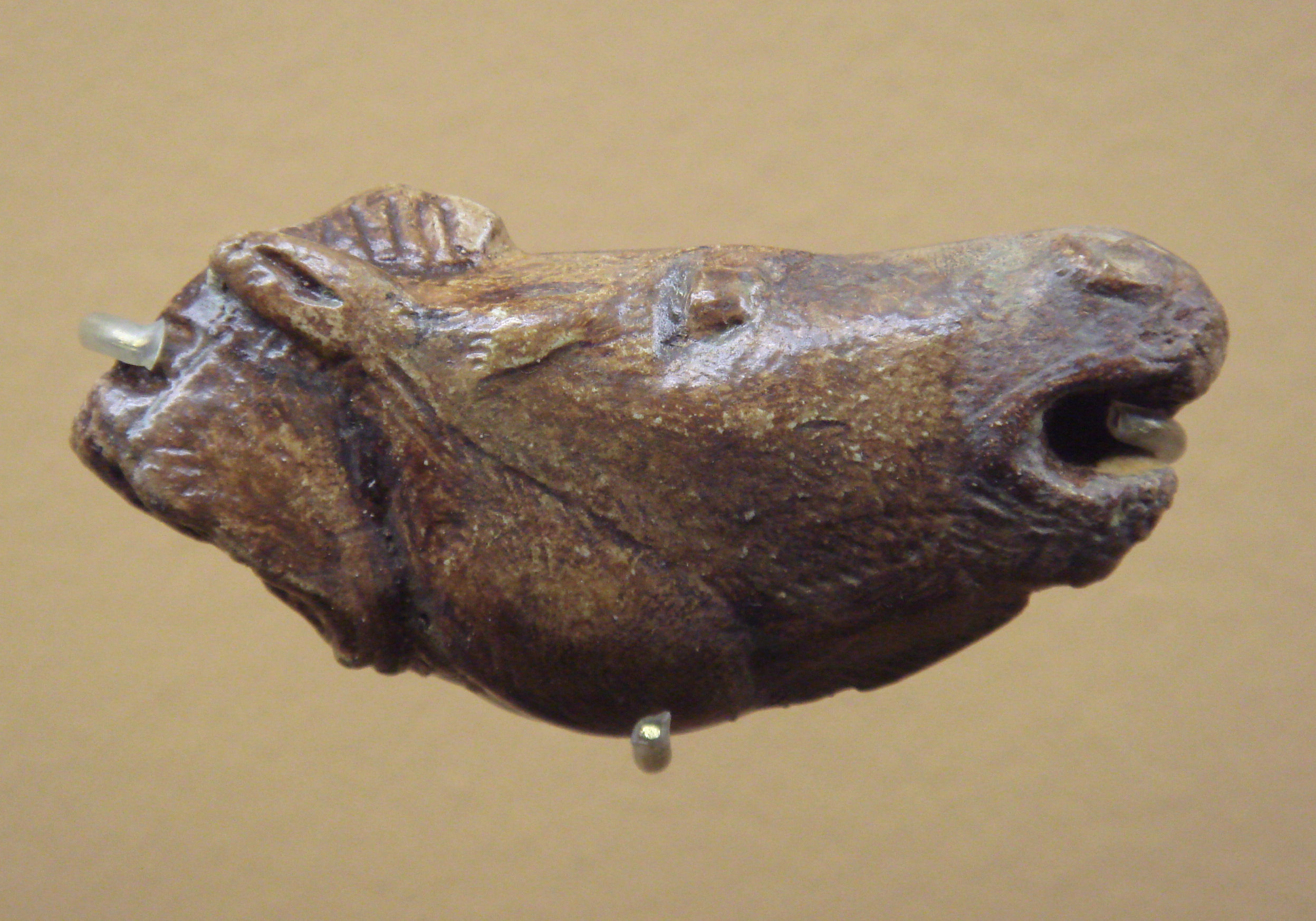
Sculpted horse head

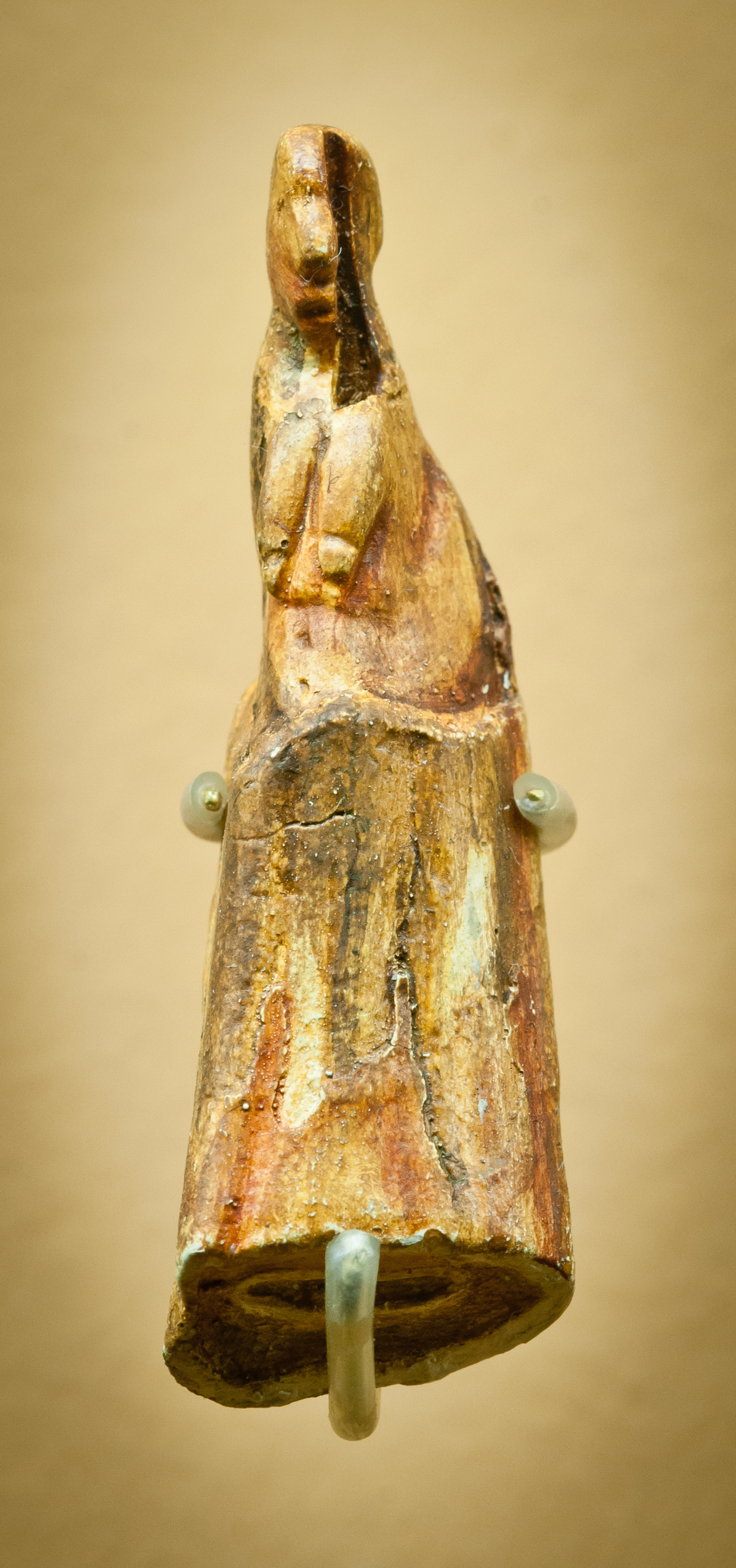
Venus of Mas d'Azil

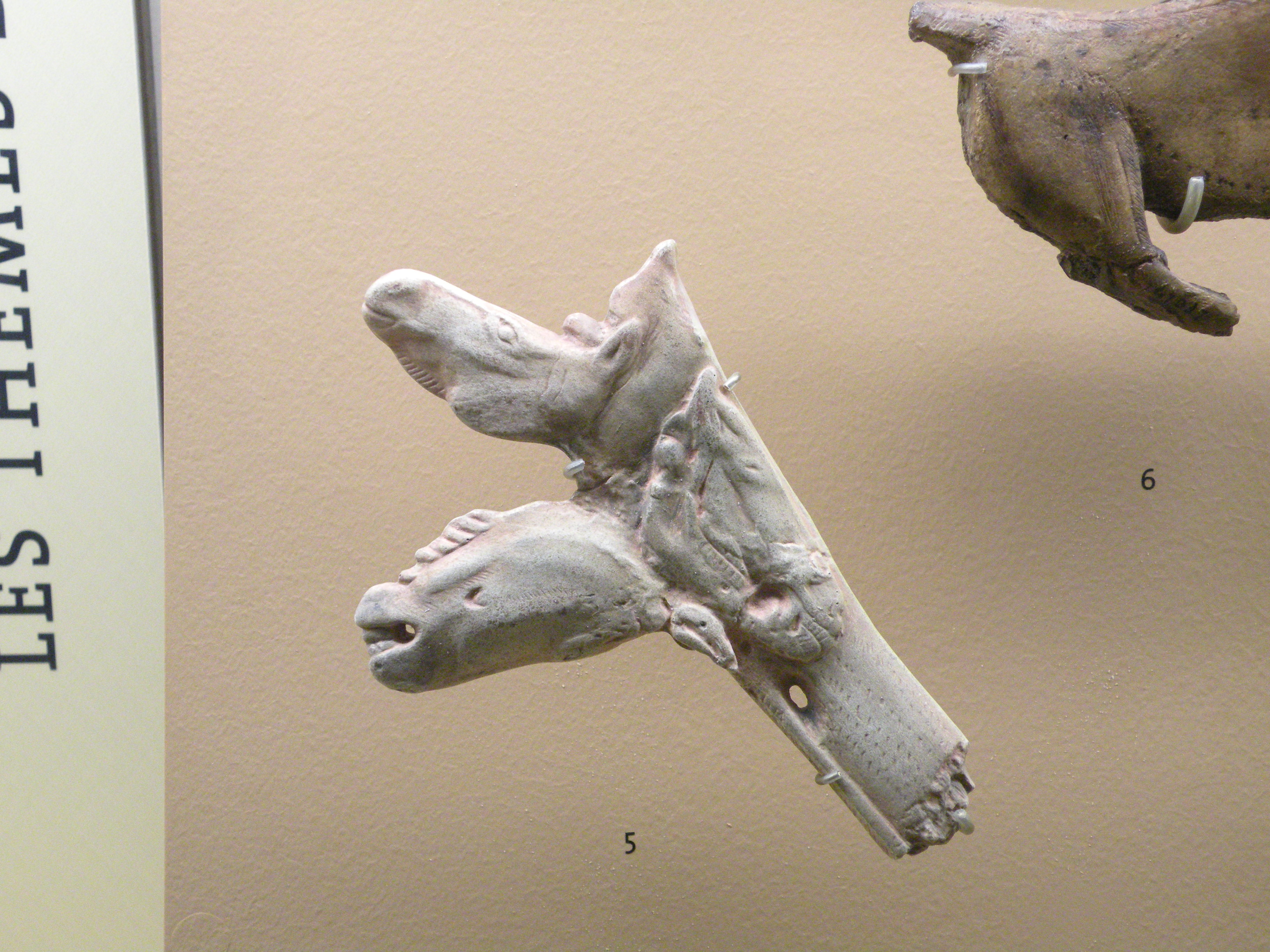
Spear thrower carved with 3 horse heads at three different ages (antler or deer bone)

==== Bone carvings ====
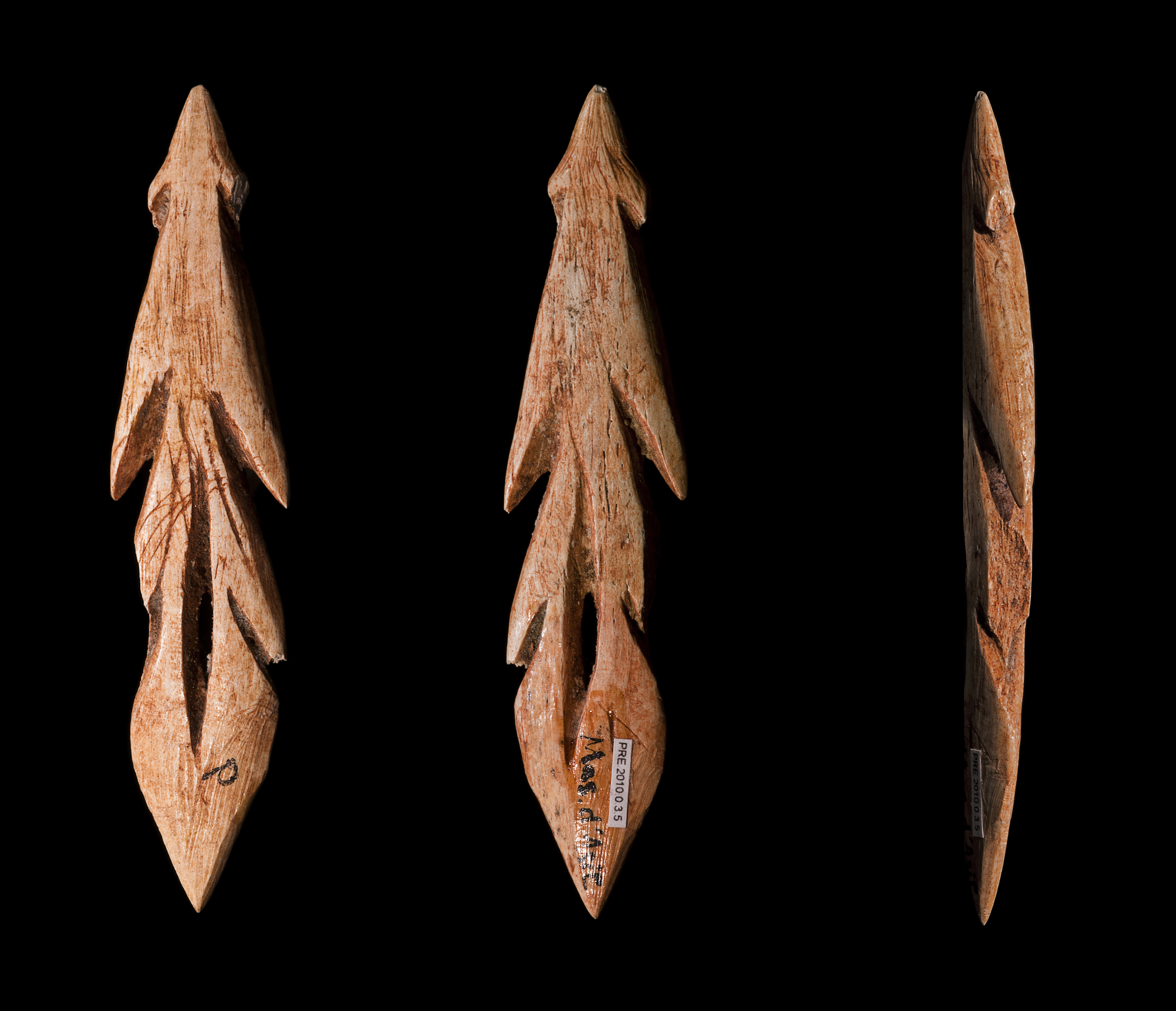
Azilian harpoon

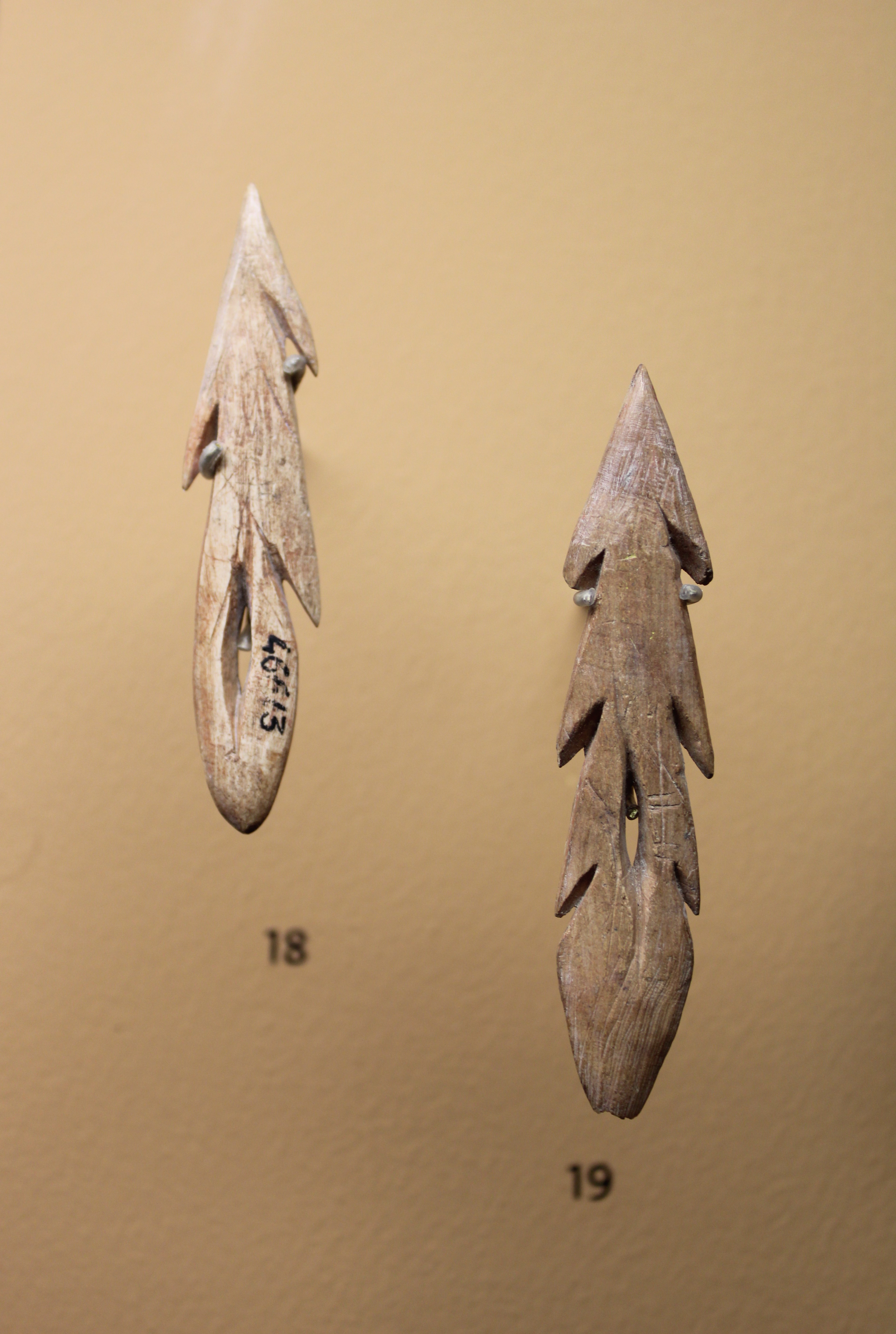
Azilian harpoon

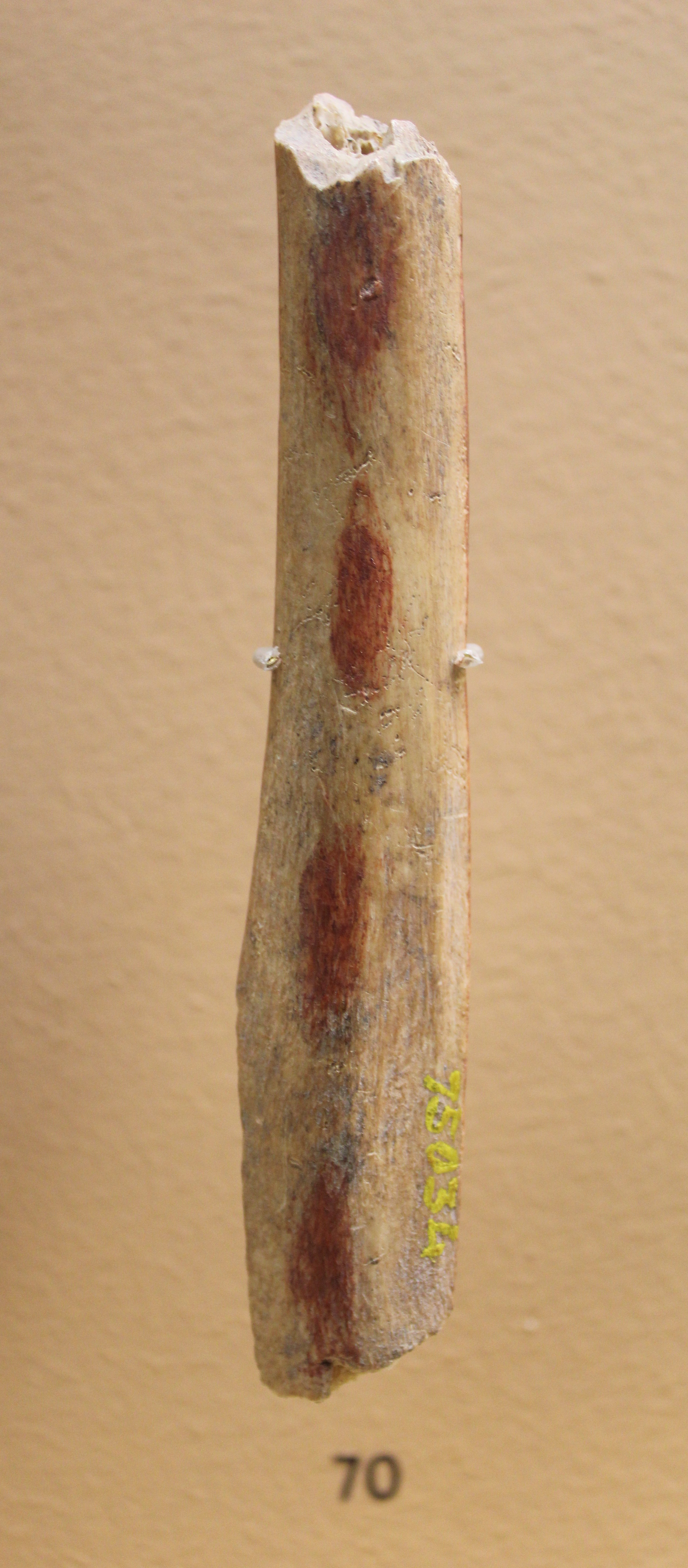
Painted bone fragment

==== Stone carvings ====
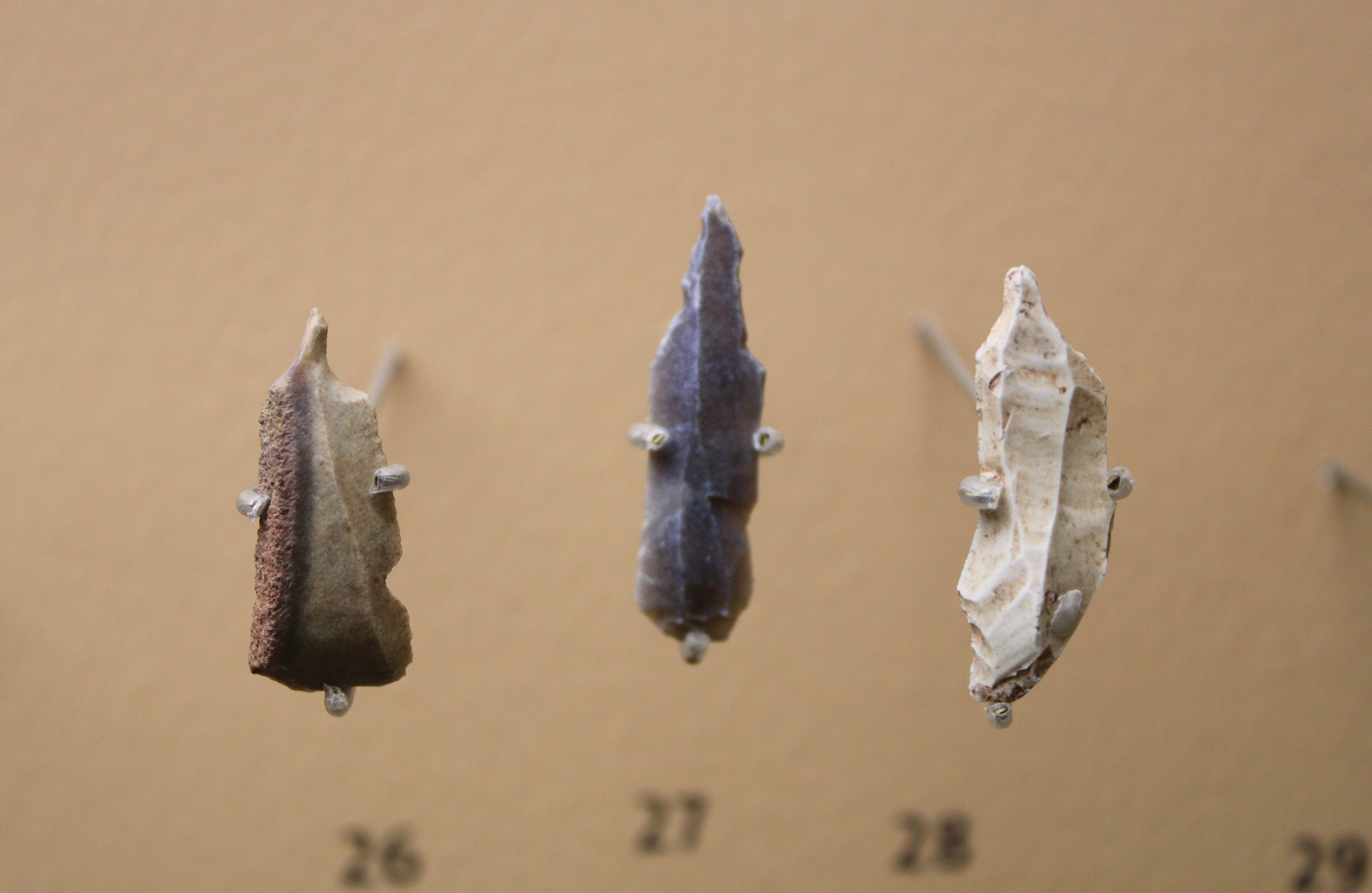
Drills

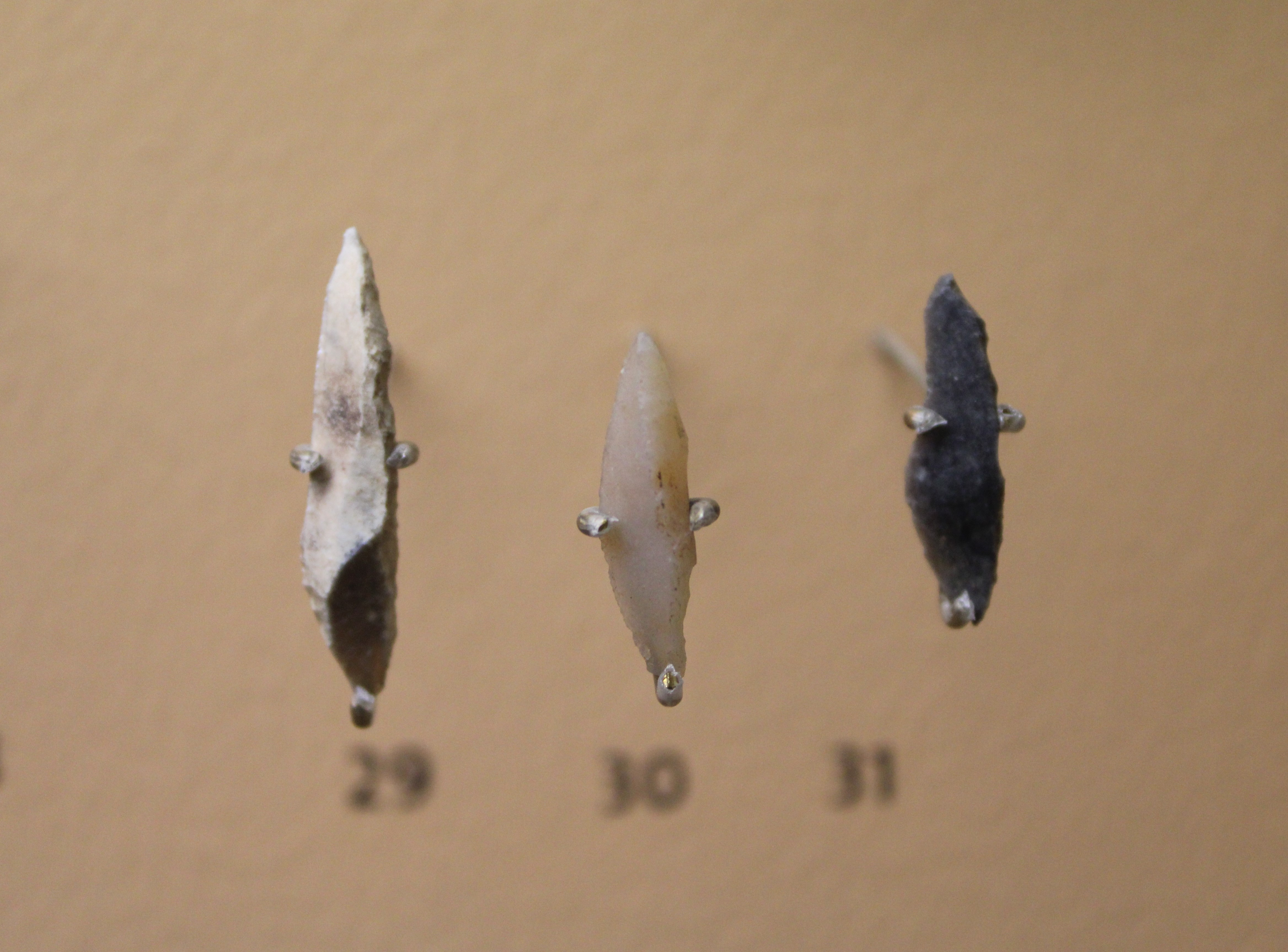
Tips

==== Painted pebbles ====
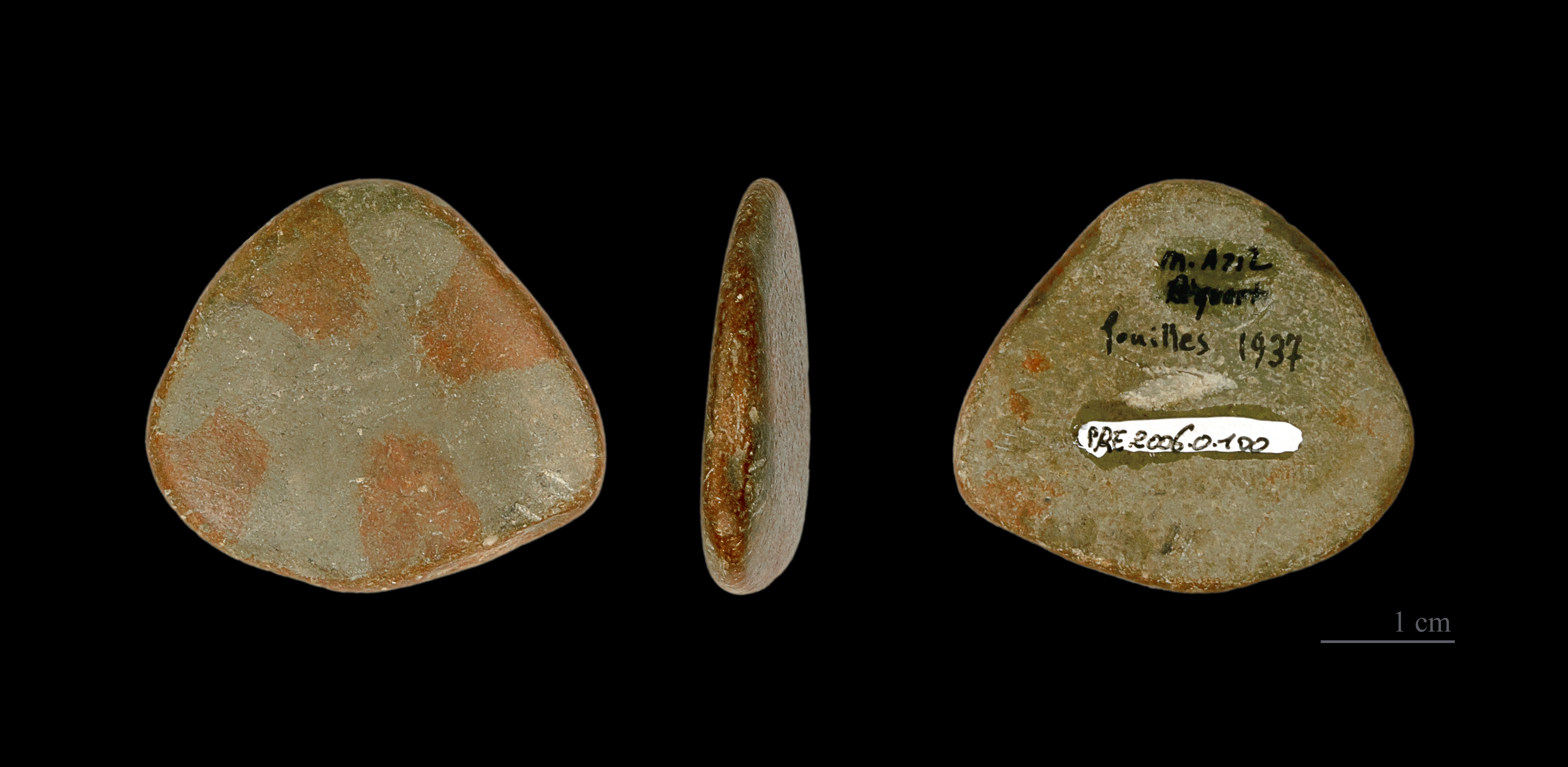
Painted pebble

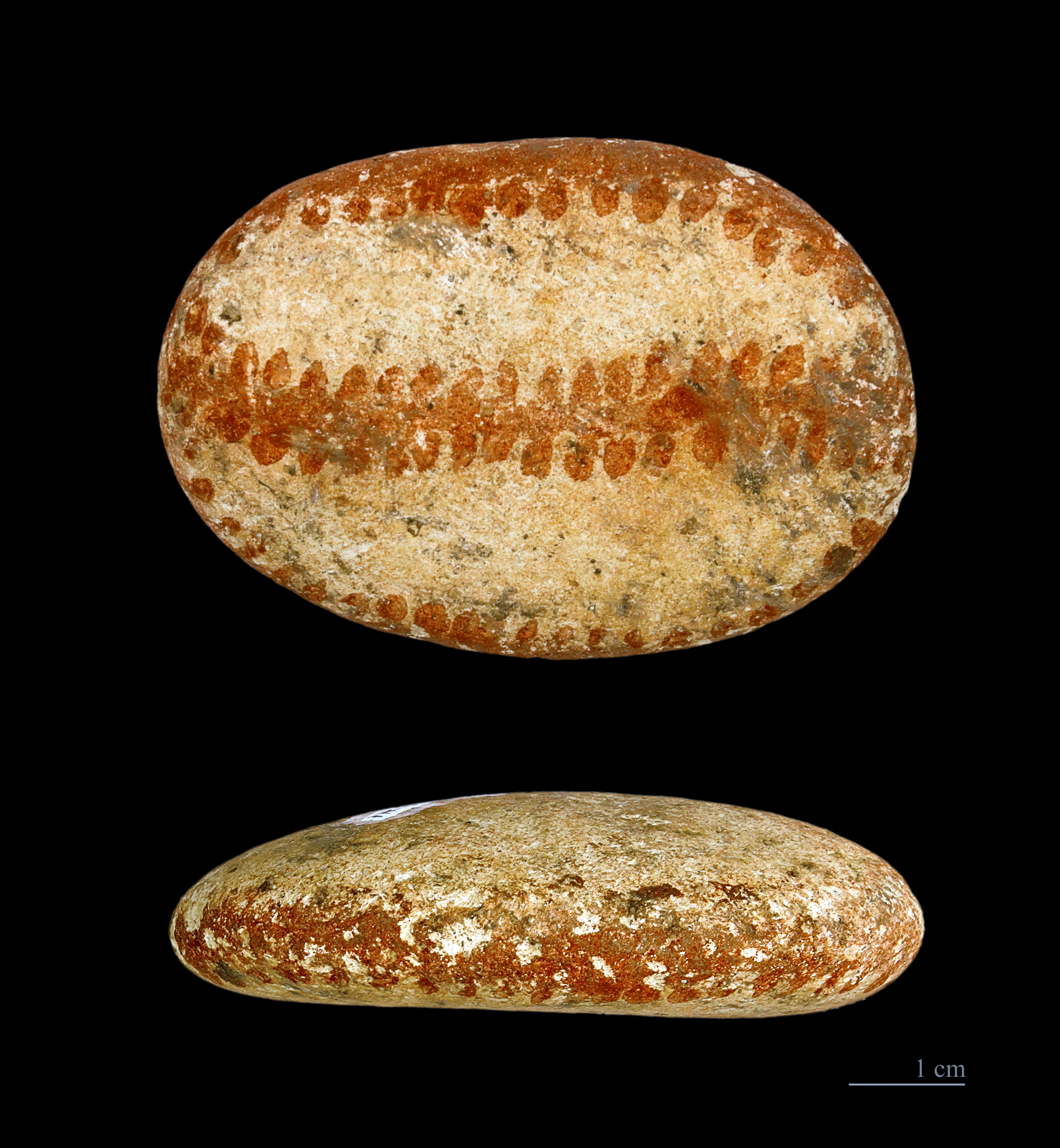
Painted pebble

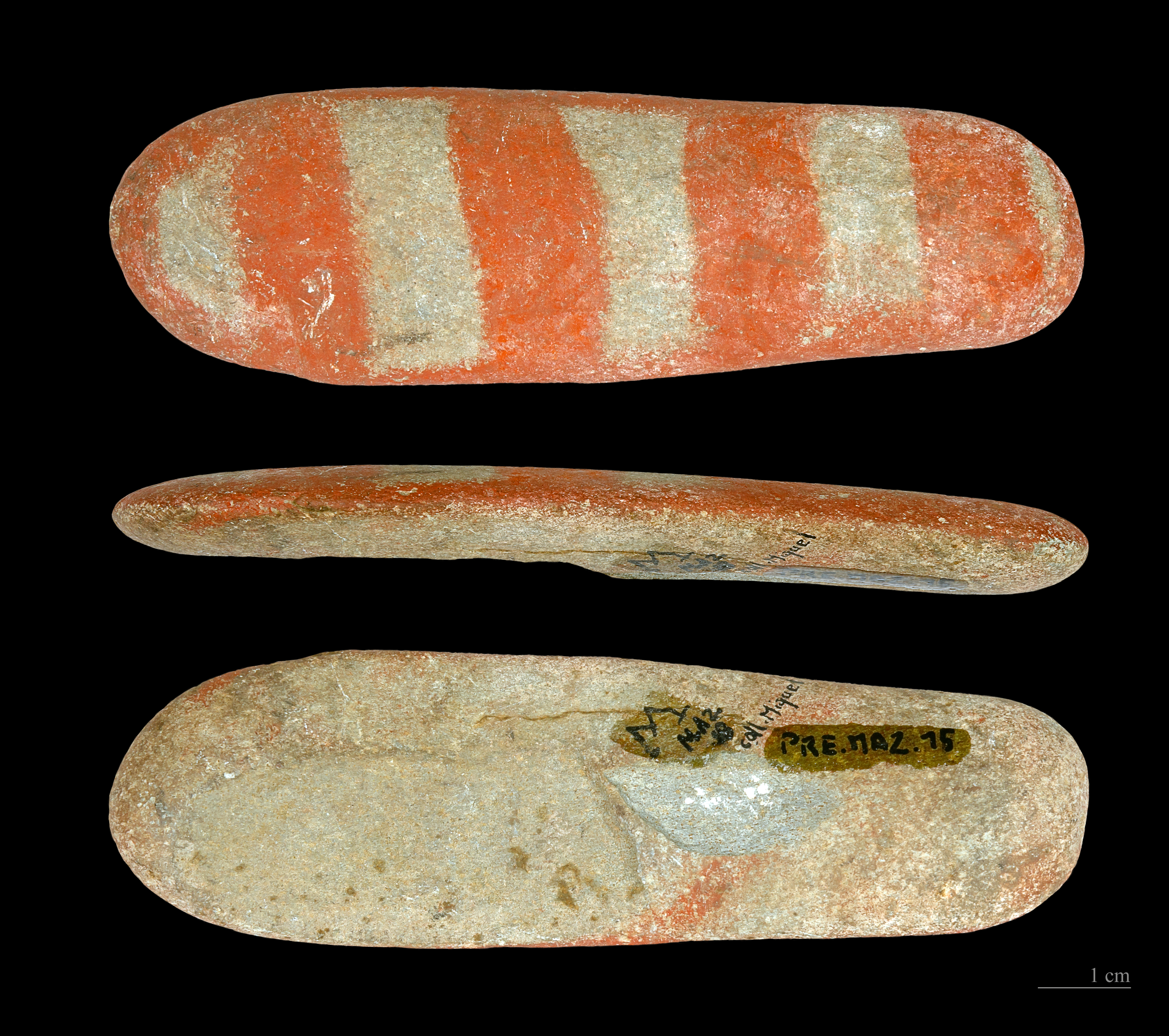
Painted pebble

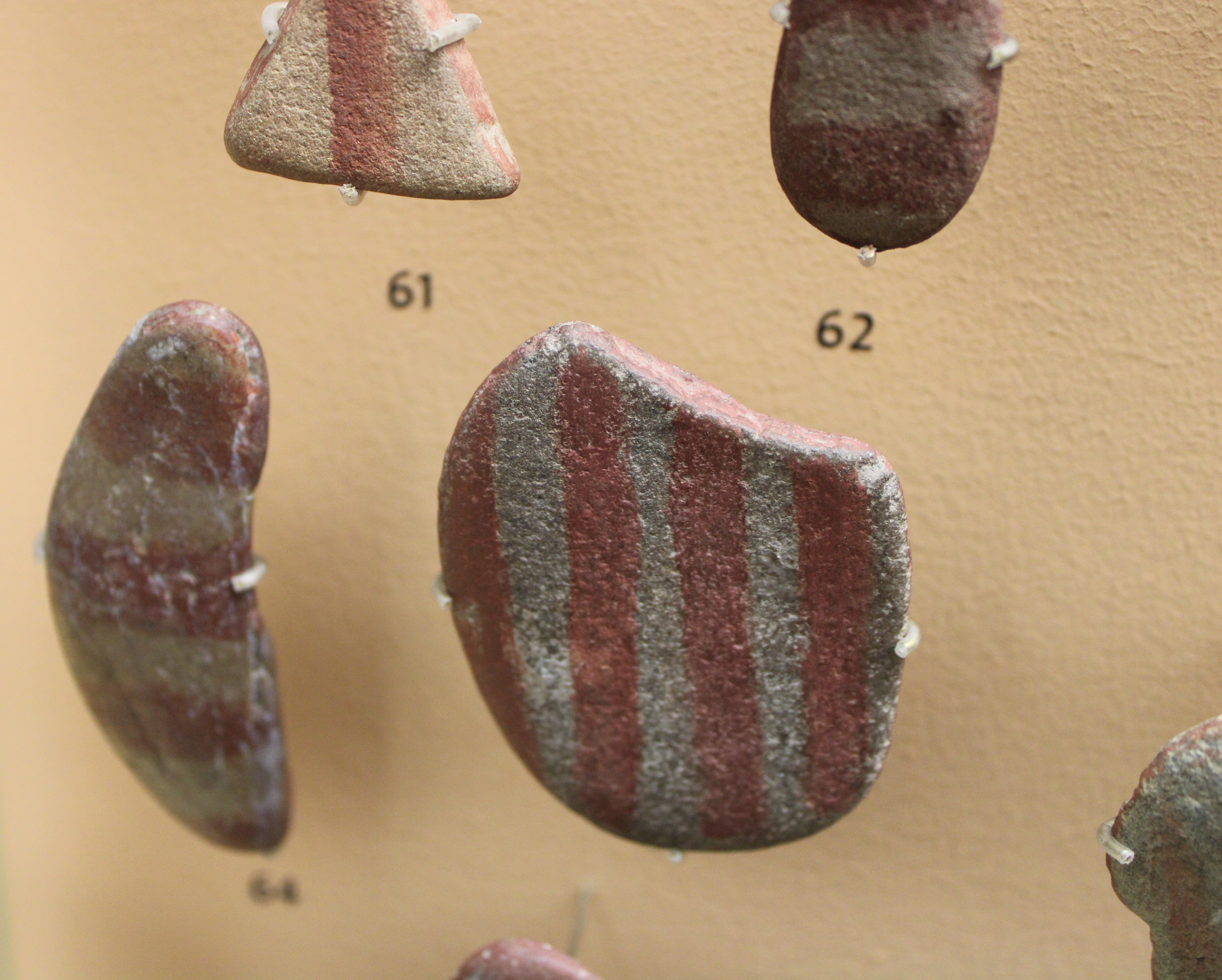
Painted pebble

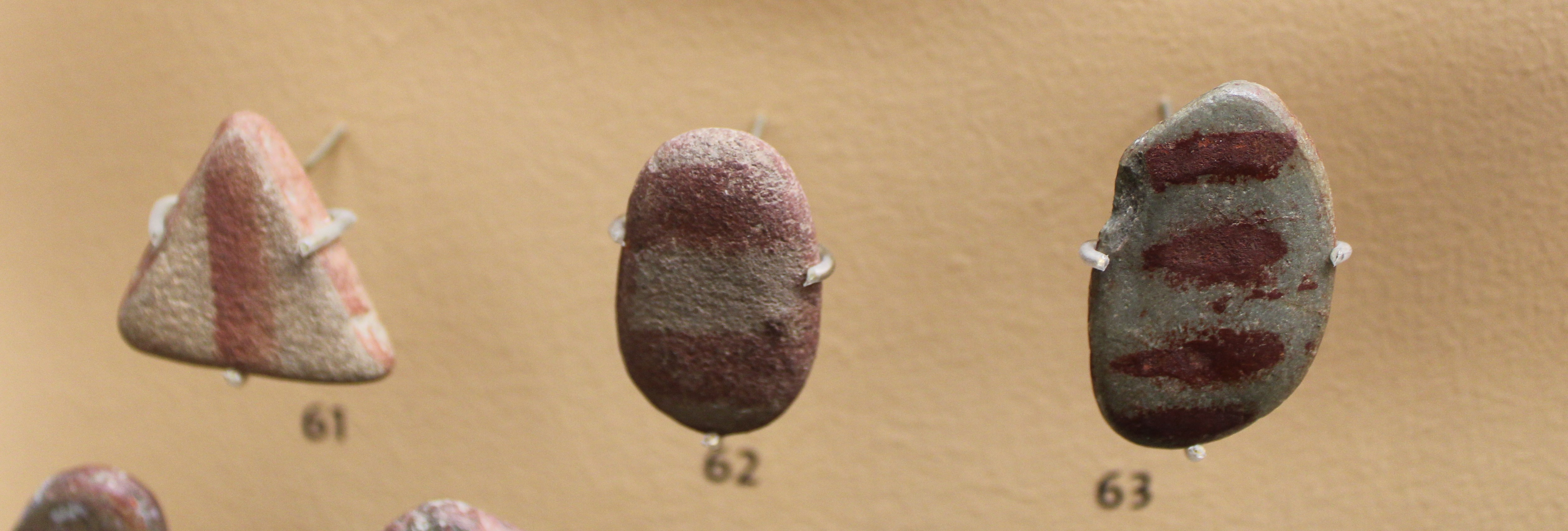
Painted pebble

==== Engraved pebbles ====
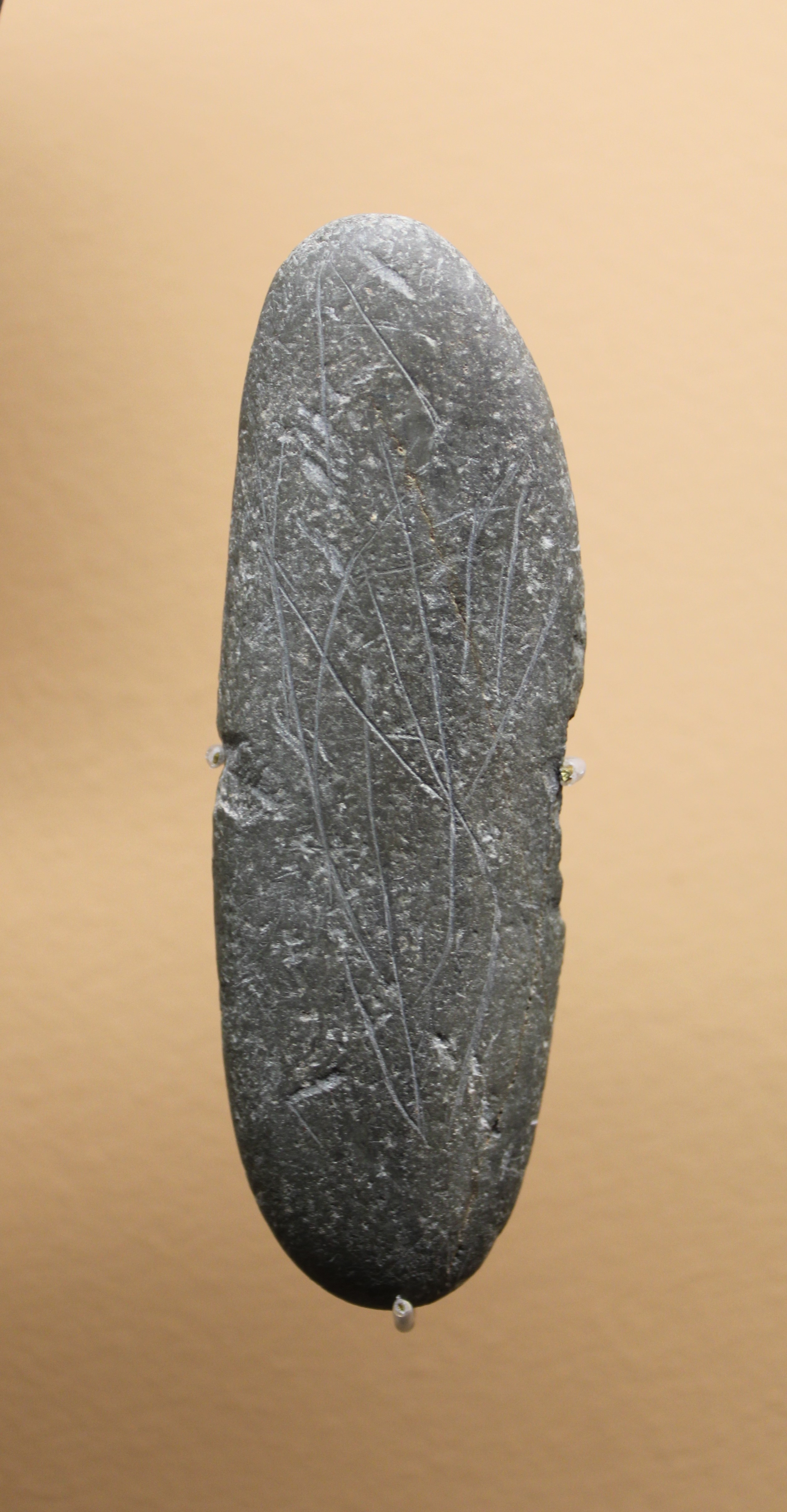
Engraved pebble

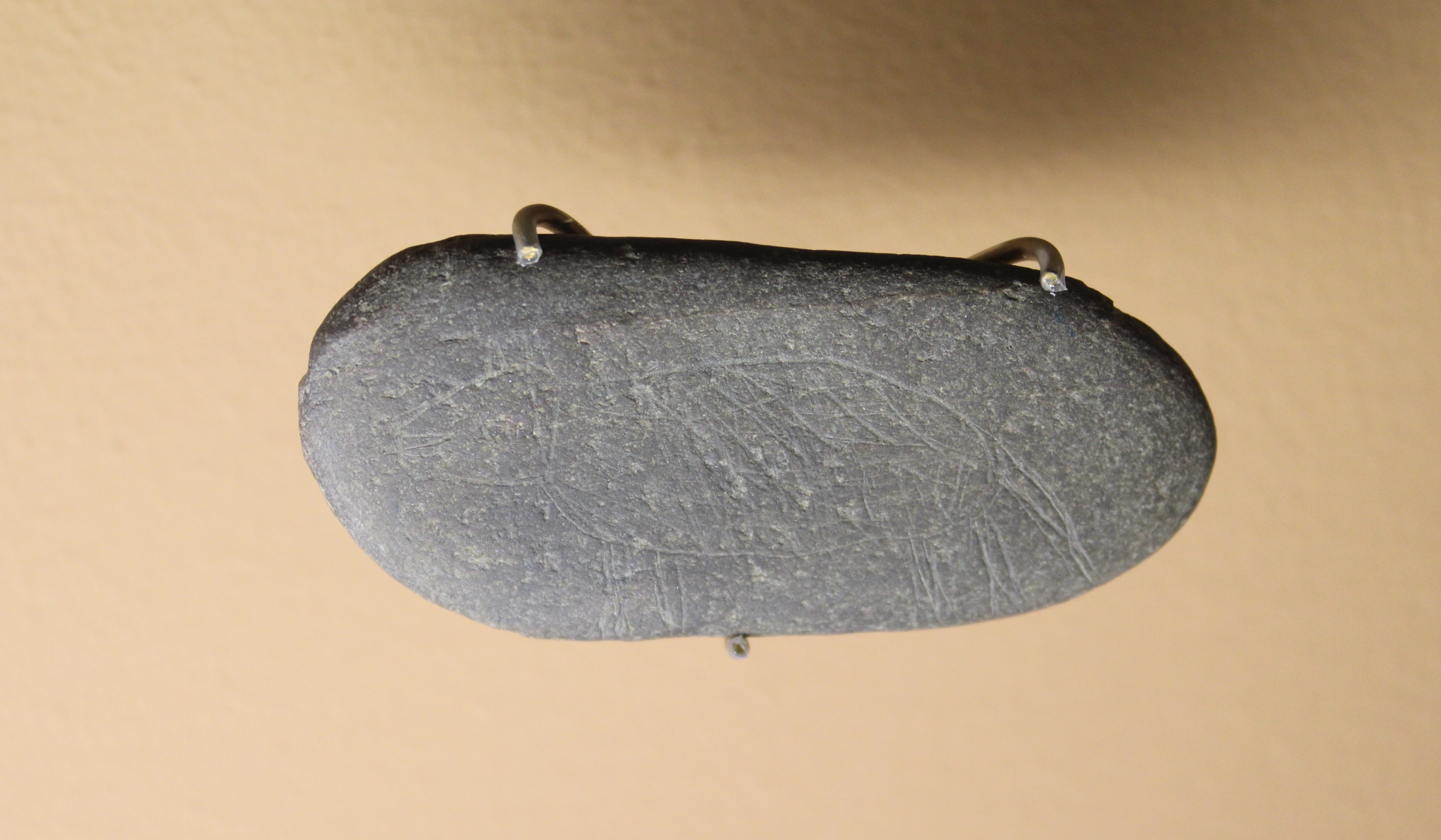
Engraved and painted pebble

== History ==
During the first centuries of the Common Era, persecuted Christians established a place of prayer in the cave.

The place also served as a refuge for the Cathars of the 13th century, and then for the Protestants in the 17th century, who took refuge there during the unsuccessful siege led in 1625 by Marshal de Thémines against the Mas-d'Azil. In retaliation, one clause of the Peace of Alès provided for the destruction of the cave's fortifications, done in 1632.

During the Second World War, the cave was requisitioned from 1 June 1940 for the Société nationale des constructions aéronautiques du Midi, which planned to establish a factory for parts for its aircraft there. The work undertaken stopped in July of the same year following the defeat of the French armies. The German occupying troops considered installing workshops for their aircraft there but the project was abandoned and the cave served to stock and repair planes.

Since 1997, the cave and its surroundings host a round of the European Championship of Prehistoric Weapons.

== Protection and tourism ==
Tourism in the cave was enhanced after the end of the Second World War, thanks to the influx of holidaymakers, prompted by the policies of the Popular Front. Major developments, included the installation of electricity, happened.

In 1942, the cave was classified as a historical monument. In 2009, the Regional Natural Park of the Ariège Pyrenees was created, which includes the Mas-d'Azil. The surroundings of the cave therefore benefit from the protection imposed by the park rules.

Parts of the cave are now available to the public. A vestige of prehistoric habitat can be visited in the upper parts of the galleries. In addition to the cave, there is a museum relating the prehistoric history of the region, in the village of Mas-d'Azil.

== See also ==
- Cave of Niaux and Lombrives, other caves in Ariège
