= Asturian culture =

Archaeological culture of coastal Iberia

The Asturian culture is an Epipalaeolithic or Mesolithic archaeological culture identified by a single form of artefact: the Asturian pick-axe, and found only in coastal locations of Iberia, especially in Eastern Asturias and Western Cantabria. It is believed that the Asturian tool was used for seafood gathering, and the sites where they are found are associated with very large shell-middens (concheros in Spanish), which can fill caves to the ceiling.

In other respects the culture is similar to the preceding Azilian of the area, which also extended further to the east along the coast. Whether there is an overlap in dating between Azilian and Asturian sites has been much discussed. Two concheros begin at 9280±440 BP, whereas Azilian dates come to an end after about 9500 BP. End dates for concheros include 7000 and 6500 BP.

== Way of life ==
The Asturian pick-axe tool is made from quartzite cobbles on average 8.5 cm long, which have been given a point at one end, which patterns of wear show was the part brought into contact in use. It is an exception to generalized microlithism of this time. The most likely use was for detaching limpets from rock. Bone tools and other types of bladed stone tools are noticeably rare around middens. There are also shell-middens in Azilian sites, but the geology is somewhat different, giving abundant flint but not quartzite, as well as broader river estuaries with mussels and oysters, easier to collect, and more palatable, than limpets.

There has been discussion in recent decades as to whether coastal "Asturian" sites where pick-axes have been found reflect a seasonal or permanent occupation. There was a suggestion that seafood was exploited in late winter and early spring, when other food was scarce, and that the population may have moved elsewhere at other times, although as yet there is little evidence of inland sites (in contrast to the Azilian and the Magdalenian before that). Oxygen-isotope studies of shells suggest they were not collected in the summer, though this does not settle the question. There are also plentiful fish remains, with more than twenty marine species at one site.

Red deer was the main mammal game, as well as roe deer, wild boar, aurochs and rarer ibex. The area had become heavily wooded, which gives red deer a more solitary lifestyle than the more open grassland landscape the area had had in the Magdalenian, when they gathered in herds.

The Asturian culture seems not to have produced anything that can be called art, lacking even the Azilian painted pebbles.

== Excavating and naming ==
It was first excavated by Ricardo, then Count Vega del Sella, later Duke of Estrada. The name was proposed by the German archaeologist working in Spain, Hugo Obermaier, in his 1916 book El Hombre fósil (translated into English in 1924).
