= Paleolithic Europe =

Prehistoric period in Europe

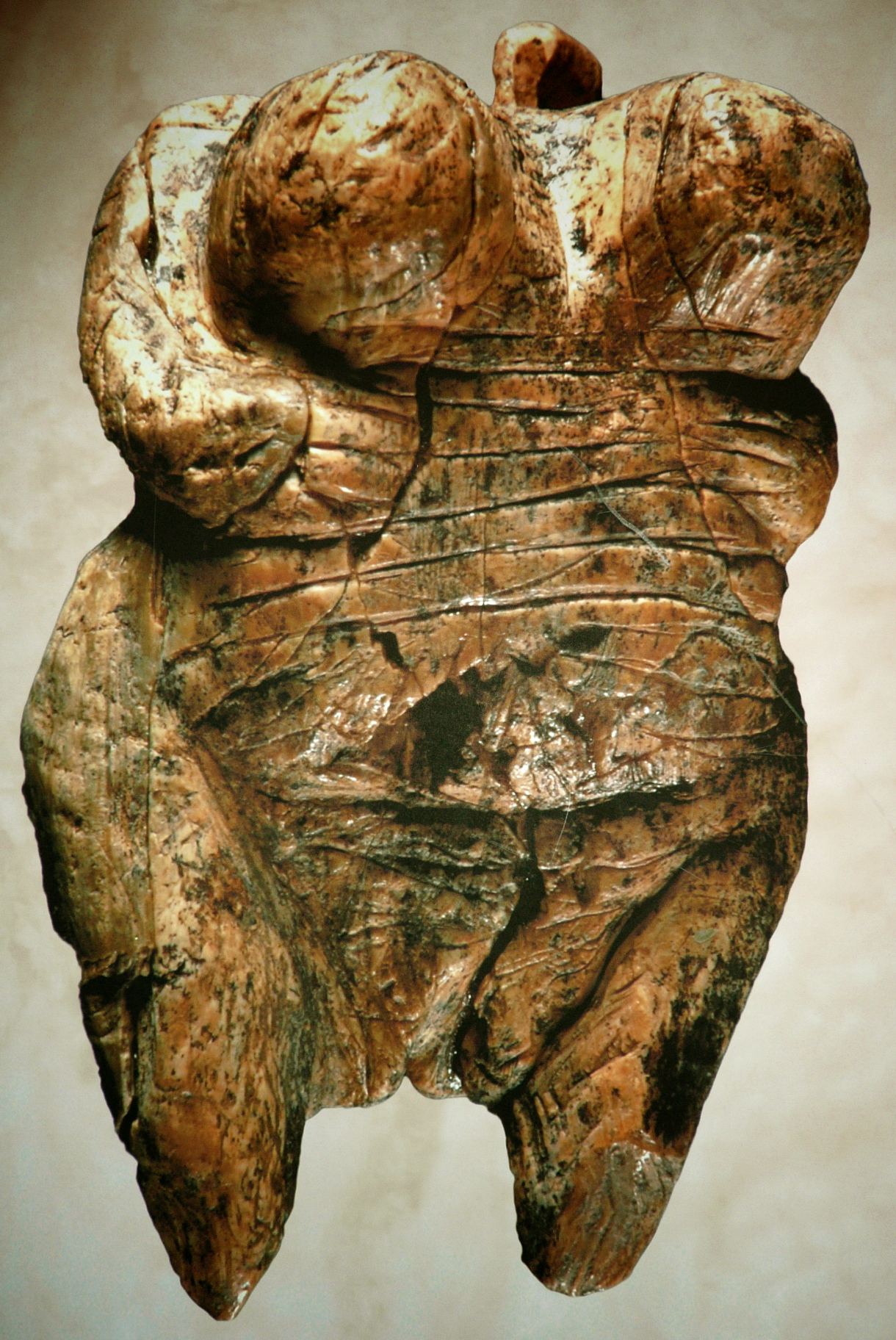
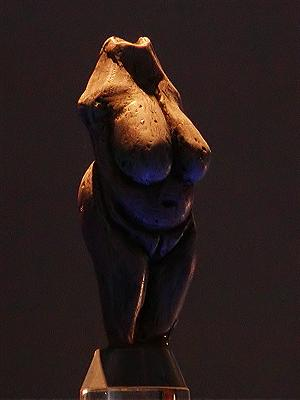
Left: The Venus of Hohle Fels. Right: Venus of Moravany, from Germany and Slovakia. 41,000–35,000 BC and around 22,800 BC

Paleolithic Europe, or Old Stone Age Europe, encompasses the Paleolithic or Old Stone Age in Europe from the arrival of the first archaic humans, about 1.4 million years ago until the beginning of the Mesolithic (also Epipaleolithic) around 10,000 years ago. This period thus covers over 99% of the total human presence on the European continent. The early arrival and disappearance of Homo erectus and Homo heidelbergensis, the appearance, complete evolution and eventual demise of Homo neanderthalensis and the immigration and successful settlement of Homo sapiens all have taken place during the European Paleolithic.

== Overview ==
The period is divided into:

- the Lower Paleolithic, from the earliest human presence (Homo antecessor and Homo heidelbergensis) to the Holstein interglacial, c. 1.4 to 0.3 million years ago;
- the Middle Paleolithic, marked by the presence of Neanderthals, 300,000 to 40,000 years ago;
- the Upper Paleolithic, c. 46,000 to 12,000 years ago, marked by the arrival of anatomically modern humans and extending throughout the Last Glacial Maximum;
- the Mesolithic or Epipaleolithic, beginning about 14,000 years ago and extending until as late as 4,000 years ago in northern Europe. The Mesolithic may or may not be included as the final phase of the Upper Paleolithic.

== Subdivisions ==
=== Lower Paleolithic: 1.4 mya – 300,000 BP ===
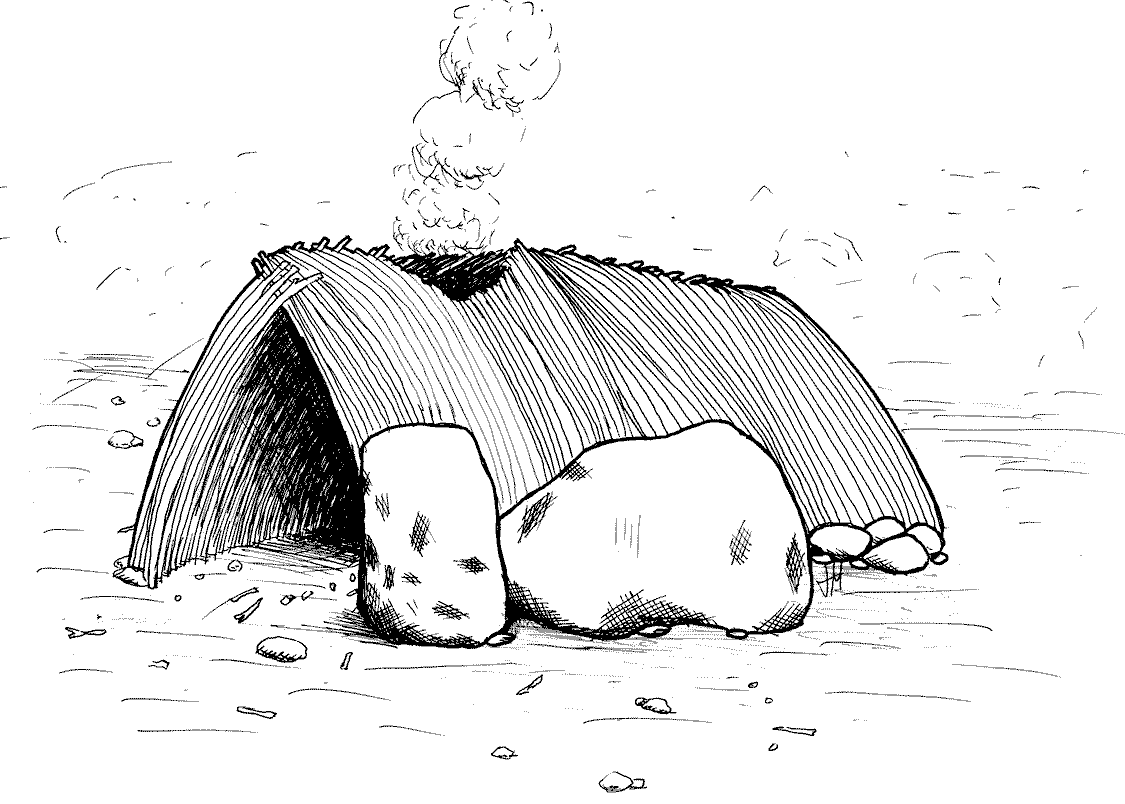
An artist's rendering of a temporary wood house, based on evidence found at Terra Amata (in Nice, France) and dated to the Lower Paleolithic (c. 400,000 BP)

The oldest evidence of human occupation in Eastern Europe comes from the Kozarnika cave in Bulgaria where a single human tooth and flint artifacts have been dated to at least 1.4 million years ago. In Western Europe at Atapuerca in Spain, human remains have been found that are from 1.2 million years ago. Five Homo erectus skulls were discovered at an excavation site in Dmanisi, Georgia. Unearthed in 2005 and described in a publication in 2013, the Dmanisi skull 5 is estimated to be about 1.8 million years old.

The earliest evidence for the use of the more advanced Mode 2-type assemblages Acheulean tools are 900,000 year-old flint hand axes found in Iberia and at a 700,000 year-old site in central France. Notable human fossils from this period were found in Kozarnika in Bulgaria (1.4 mya), at Atapuerca in Spain (1.2 mya), in Mauer in Germany (500k), at Eartham Pit, Boxgrove England (478k), at Swanscombe in England (400k), and Tautavel in France (400k).

The oldest complete hunting weapons ever found anywhere in the world were discovered in 1995 in a coal mine near the town Schöningen, Germany, where the Schöningen spears, eight 380,000-year-old wooden javelins were unearthed.

=== Middle Paleolithic: 300,000–50,000 BP ===
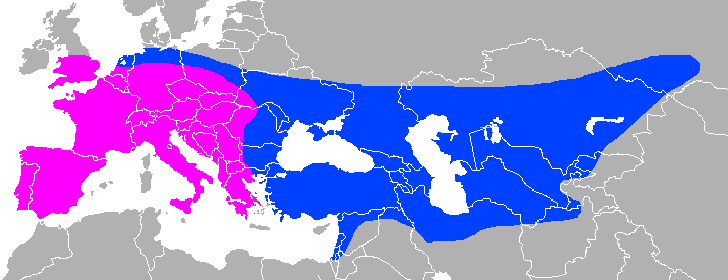
Approximate ranges of pre-Neanderthal (H. heidelbergensis) and early Neanderthal (purple) and of classical and late Neanderthal (blue).

Elements of the European and African Homo erectus populations evolved between 800,000 and 400,000 years ago through a series of intermediate speciations towards Homo antecessor and Homo heidelbergensis. Fossils of the species Homo neanderthalensis are only to be found in Eurasia. Neanderthal fossil record ranges from Western Europe to the Altai Mountains in Central Asia and the Ural Mountains in the North to the Levant in the South. Unlike its predecessors they were biologically and culturally adapted to survival in cold environments and successfully extended their range to the glacial environments of central Europe and the Russian plains. The great number and in some cases exceptional state of preservation of Neanderthal fossils and cultural assemblages enables researchers to provide a detailed and accurate data on behavior and culture. Neanderthals are associated with the Mousterian culture (Mode 3), stone tools that first appeared approximately 160,000 years ago.

The "Divje Babe flute" from the Divje Babe I cave is a perforated bone, believed by some to be a musical instrument. If so, it would be evidence that the Middle Paleolithic Neanderthal inhabitants of Europe may have made and used musical instruments.

=== Upper Paleolithic: 50,000–10,000 BP ===
The earliest modern human remains which have been directly dated are from 46,000 to 44,000 years ago in the Bacho Kiro cave, located in present-day Bulgaria. They are associated with the Initial Upper Paleolithic (IUP), the earliest culture of modern humans in Europe. These people do not appear to have been the ancestors of later Europeans as the very few ancient DNA (aDNA) samples recovered from this period are not related to later samples.

==== Aurignacian ====
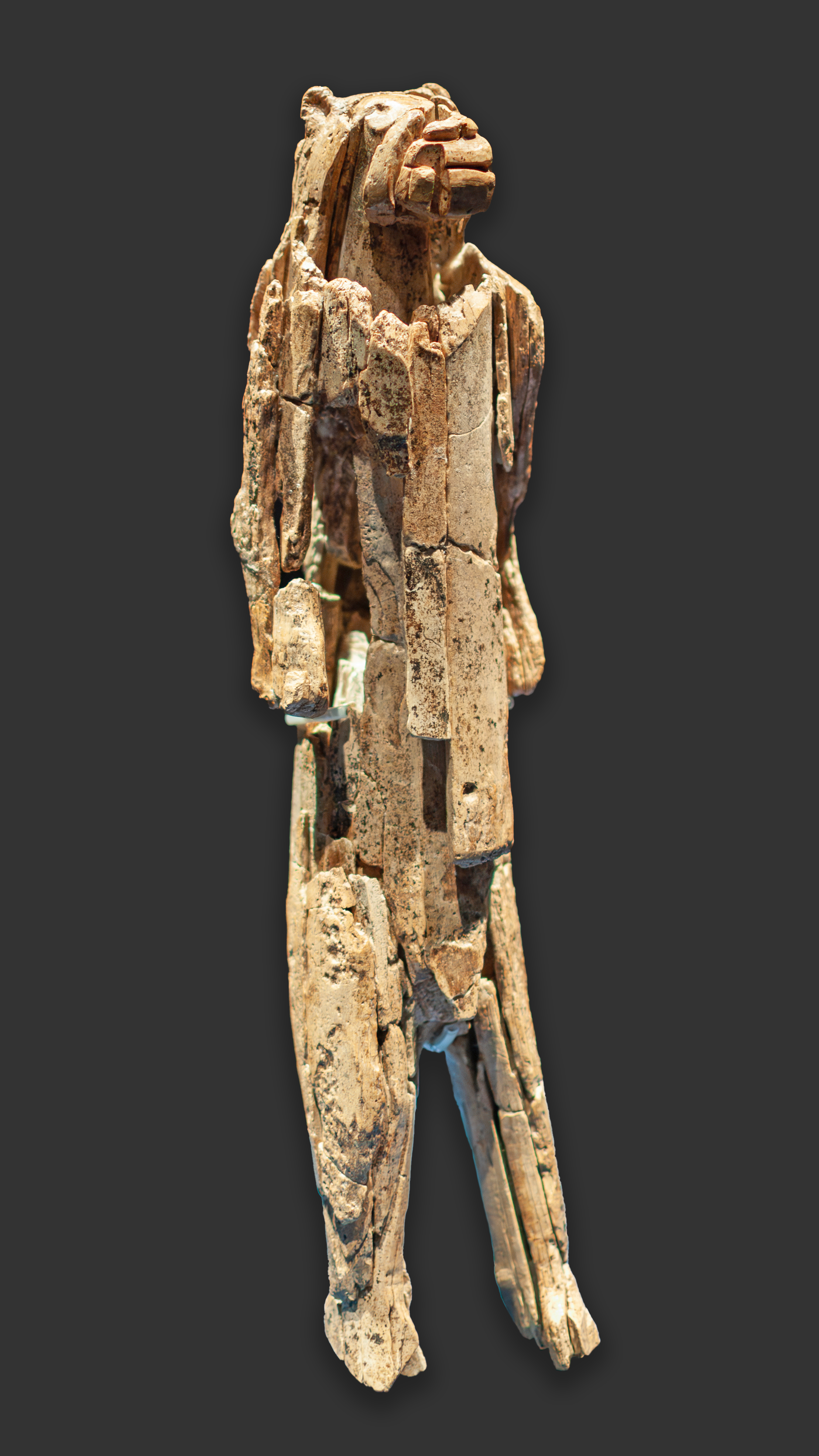
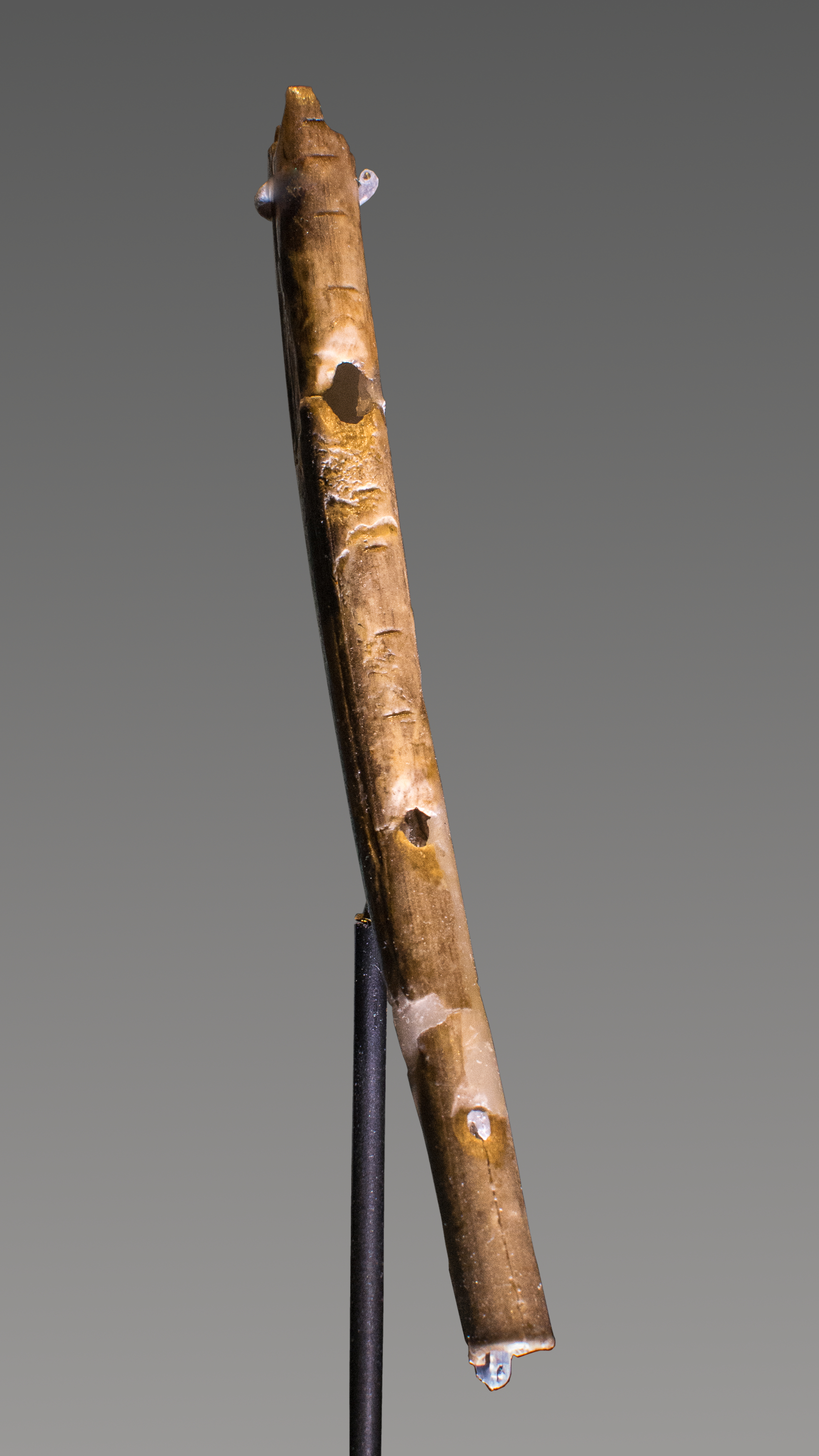
Left: The Lion-Man of Hohlenstein-Stadel. Right: Bone flute from Geißenklösterle. Aurignacian culture, 43,000–35,000 BC, Germany

The IUP was followed by the Aurignacian. The origins of this culture can be located in Eastern Europe, in what is now Bulgaria (proto-Aurignacian) and Hungary (first full Aurignacian). By 35,000 BCE, the Aurignacian culture and its technology had extended through most of Europe. Studies of aDNA have found an association between 35,000 year old Aurignacian remains in the Goyet Cave system in Belgium and Mesolithic hunter-gatherers in Western Europe. The same aDNA signature is found in the intervening period in Iberia, suggesting that the area was a refuge for hunter-gatherers at the height of the Last Glacial Maximum.

==== Gravettian ====
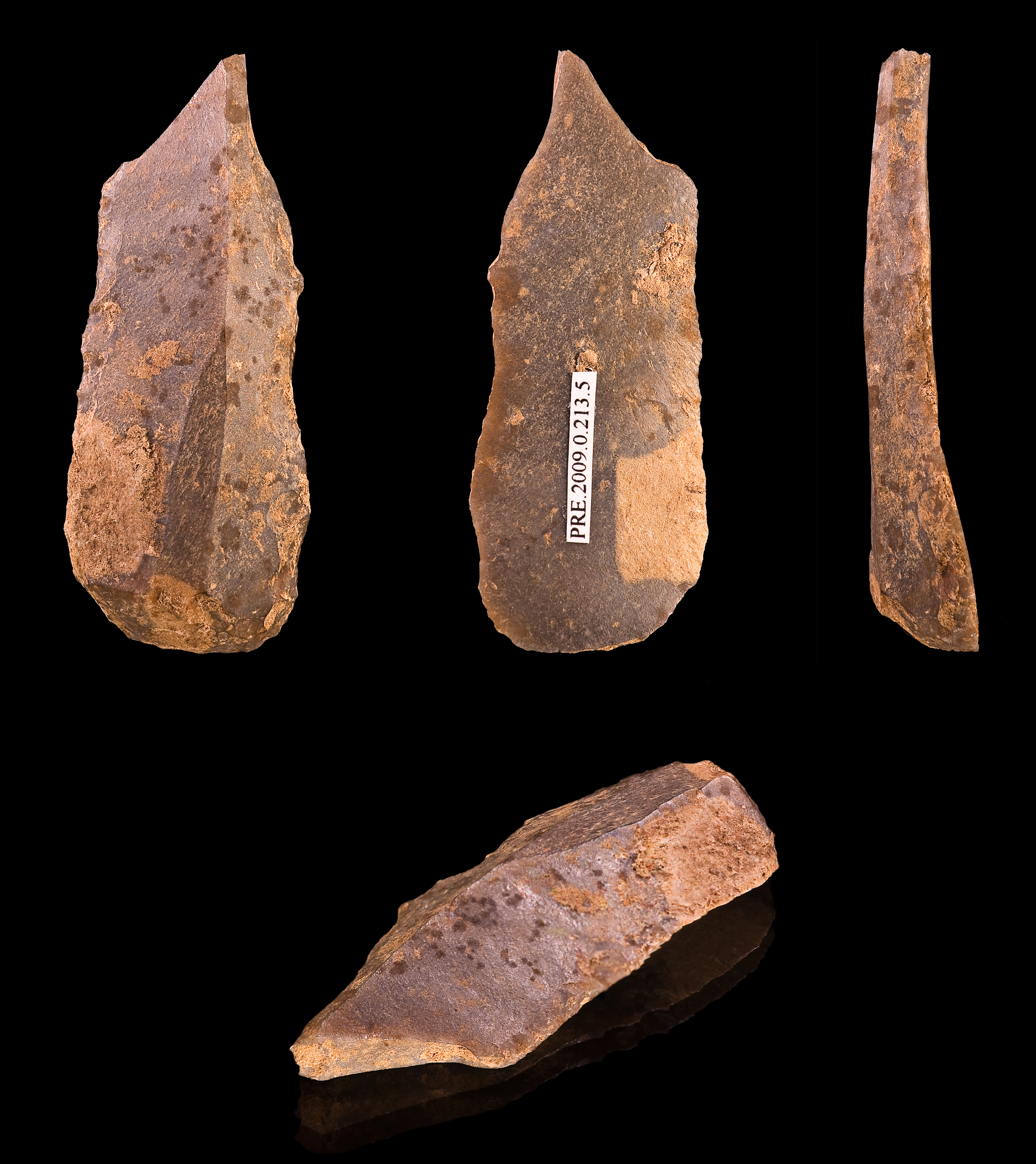
Burins of the Gravettian culture discovered in Brassempouy, southwestern France. Currently preserved in the Muséum de Toulouse.

Around 32,000 BCE, the Gravettian culture appears in the Crimean Mountains (southern Ukraine). Around 22,000 BCE, the Solutrean and Gravettian cultures reach the southwestern region of Europe. The Gravettian technology/culture has been theorized to have come with migrations of people from the Middle East, Anatolia, and the Balkans. The cultures might be linked with the transitional cultures mentioned before, because their techniques have some similarities and are both very different from Aurignacian ones but this issue is thus far very obscure. The Gravettian soon disappears from southwestern Europe, with the notable exception of the Mediterranean coasts of Iberia. The Gravettian culture also appears in the Caucasus and the Zagros Mountains.

The Solutrean culture, extended from northern Spain to southeastern France, includes not only an advanced stone technology but also the first significant development of cave painting, the use of the needle and possibly that of the bow and arrow.

The more widespread Gravettian culture is no less advanced, at least in artistic terms: sculpture (mainly venuses) is the most outstanding form of creative expression of these peoples.

==== Transition to the Mesolithic ====
Around 17,000 BCE, Europe witnesses the appearance of a new culture, known as Magdalenian, possibly rooted in the old Aurignacian one. This culture soon supersedes the Solutrean area and also the Gravettian of Central Europe. However, in Mediterranean Iberia, the Italian Peninsula, and Eastern Europe, epi-Gravettian cultures continue evolving locally.

With the Magdalenian culture, Paleolithic development in Europe reaches its peak and this is reflected in the advanced art, owing to the previous traditions of painting in the West and sculpture in Central Europe.

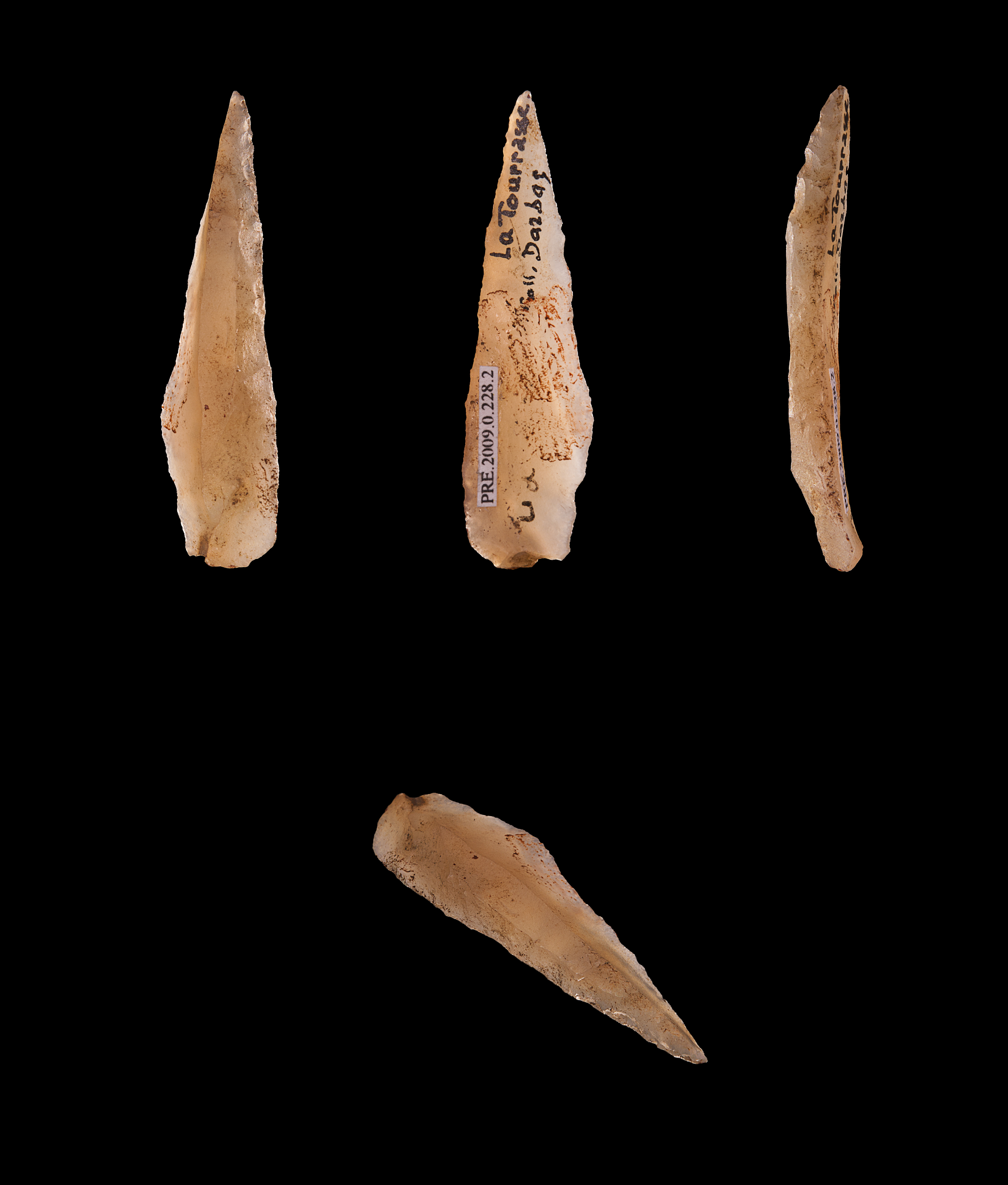
Azilian points, microliths from epipaleolithic northern Spain and southern France.

Around 10,500 BCE, the Würm Glacial age ends. Slowly, through the following millennia, temperatures and sea levels rise, changing the environment of prehistoric people. Nevertheless, Magdalenian culture persists until circa 8000 BCE, when it quickly evolves into two microlithist cultures: Azilian, in northern Spain and southern France, and Sauveterrian, in northern France and Central Europe, which are described as either Epipaleolithic or Mesolithic. Though there are some differences, both cultures share several traits: the creation of very small stone tools called microliths and the scarcity of figurative art, which seems to have vanished almost completely, being replaced by abstract decoration of tools, and in the Azilian, pebbles.

In the late phase of this Epipaleolithic period, the Sauveterrian culture evolves into the so-called Tardenoisian and influences strongly its southern neighbour, clearly replacing it in Mediterranean Spain and Portugal. The recession of the glaciers allows human colonization in Northern Europe for the first time. The Maglemosian culture, derived from the Sauveterre-Tardenois culture but with a strong personality, colonizes Denmark and the nearby regions, including parts of Great Britain.

== By country/region ==
- France
- Iberia
- Switzerland

== See also ==
- Chalcolithic Europe
- Geological history of Europe
- Neolithic Europe
- Prehistoric Europe
