= Paleo-European =

Paleo-European (Palaeo-European) may refer to:

- in geology, the remote geological history of Europe
- in archaeology, the deep Prehistory of Europe
  - Paleolithic Europe
  - Mesolithic Europe
  - Neolithic Europe
    - the proposed Old European culture
- in historical linguistics, the Paleo-European languages are the pre-Indo-European and sometimes pre-Finno-Ugric (pre-Sami) languages of Europe
  - the suggested Macro-Caucasian language group (John Bengtson 2008)
- in scientific racism, Paleo-Europeans a supposed racial type native to Europe proper
