= Fresnes-en-Tardenois =

- Commune
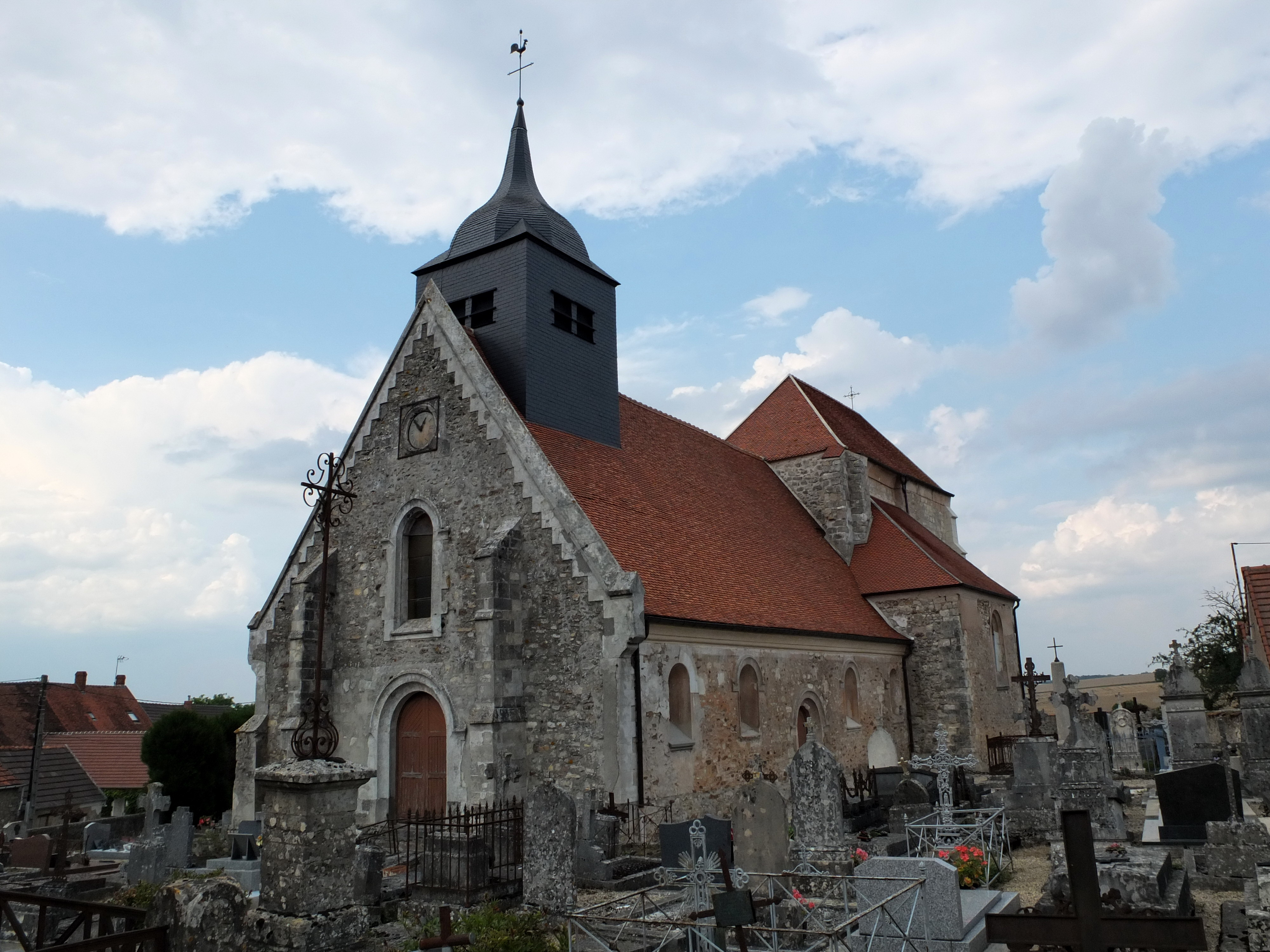
- The church of Fresnes-en-Tardenois
- Location of Fresnes-en-Tardenois
- Location within France Location within Hauts-de-France
- Coordinates: 49°08′48″N 3°33′24″E
- Country: France
- Region: Hauts-de-France
- Department: Aisne
- Arrondissement: Château-Thierry
- Canton: Fère-en-Tardenois
- Intercommunality: CA Région de Château-Thierry

Government
  - Mayor (2026–32): Corentin Legendre
- Area^{1}: 8.84 km^{2} (3.41 sq mi)
- Elevation: 125 m (410 ft)
- Highest elevation: 221 m (725 ft)
- Lowest elevation: 133 m (436 ft)
- Population (2023): 272
  - Density: 30.8/km^{2} (79.7/sq mi)
- Time zone: UTC+01:00 (CET)
  - Summer (DST): UTC+02:00 (CEST)
- INSEE/Postal code: 02332 /02130
- ^{1} French Land Register data, which excludes lakes, ponds, glaciers > 1 km^{2} (0.386 sq mi or 247 acres) and river estuaries.

Fresnes-en-Tardenois (French pronunciation: [fʁɛn ɑ̃ taʁdənwa], literally Fresnes in Tardenois) is a commune in the Aisne department in Hauts-de-France in northern France.

== Population ==
Historical population
Year	Pop.	±% p.a.
1968	188	—
1975	211	+1.66%
1982	191	−1.41%
1990	245	+3.16%
1999	263	+0.79%
2007	243	−0.98%
2012	259	+1.28%
2017	268	+0.69%
2023	272	+0.25%
Source: INSEE

== See also ==
- Communes of the Aisne department
