= Ville-en-Tardenois =

- Commune
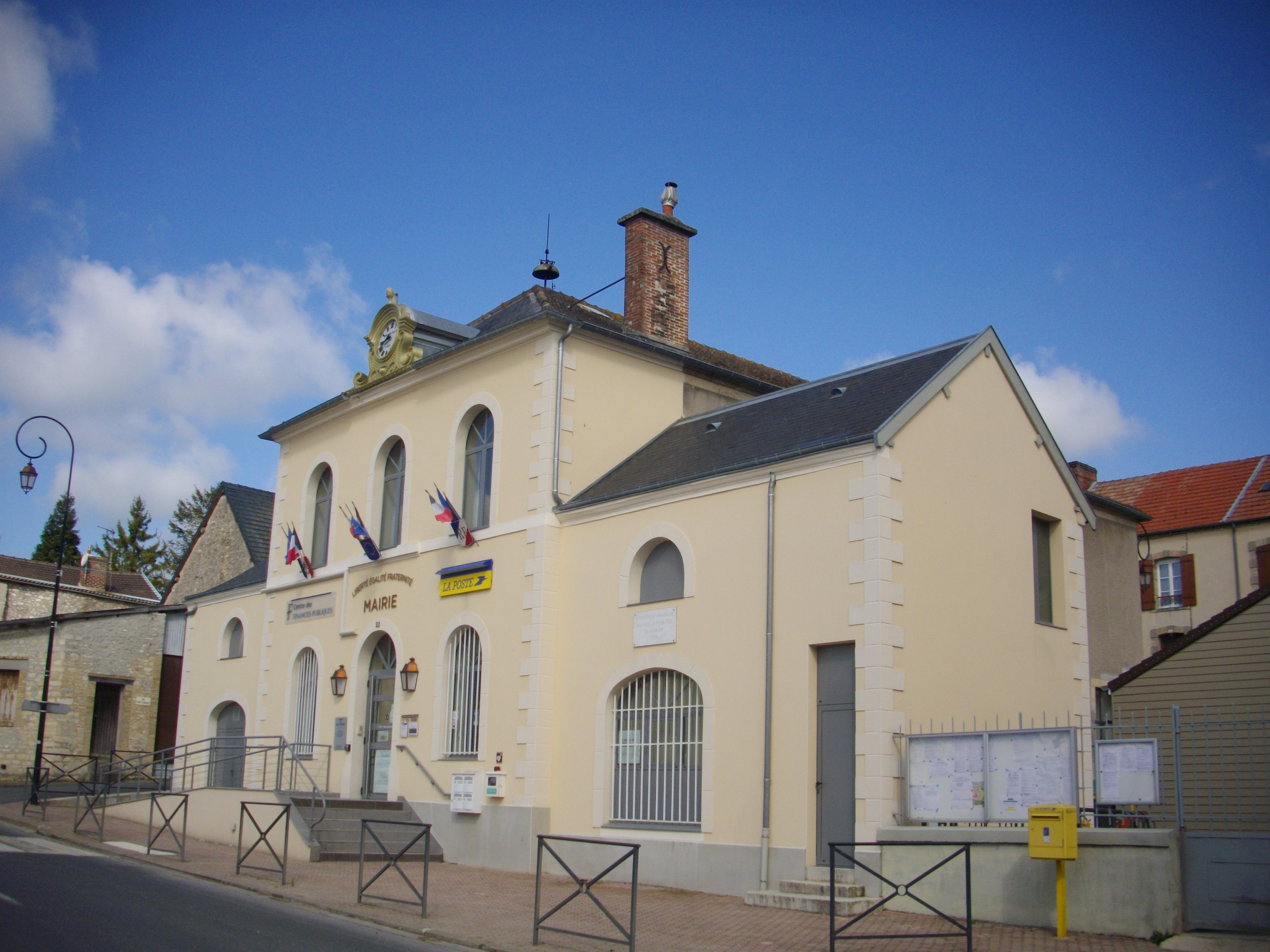
- The town hall in Ville-en-Tardenois

- Coat of arms
- Location of Ville-en-Tardenois
- Location within France Location within Grand Est
- Coordinates: 49°10′55″N 3°48′00″E
- Country: France
- Region: Grand Est
- Department: Marne
- Arrondissement: Reims
- Canton: Dormans-Paysages de Champagne
- Intercommunality: CU Grand Reims

Government
  - Mayor (2020–2026): Thierry Briançon
- Area^{1}: 11.2 km^{2} (4.3 sq mi)
- Elevation: 147 m (482 ft)
- Population (2023): 660
  - Density: 59/km^{2} (150/sq mi)
- Time zone: UTC+01:00 (CET)
  - Summer (DST): UTC+02:00 (CEST)
- INSEE/Postal code: 51624 /51170
- ^{1} French Land Register data, which excludes lakes, ponds, glaciers > 1 km^{2} (0.386 sq mi or 247 acres) and river estuaries.

Ville-en-Tardenois (French pronunciation: [vil ɑ̃ taʁdənwa]) is a commune in the Marne department in north-eastern France.

It is named for the Tardenois region.

== See also ==
- Communes of the Marne department
- Montagne de Reims Regional Natural Park
