= Tardenoisian =

Archaeological culture in Europe from the Late Mesolithic

- Alternative names: Beuronian
- Geographical range: northern France, Europe
- Period: Mesolithic/Epipaleolithic
- Type site: Fère-en-Tardenois
- Preceded by: Magdalenian Culture

The Tardenoisian (or Beuronian) is an archaeological culture of the Mesolithic/Epipaleolithic period from northern France and Belgium. Similar cultures are known further east in central Europe, parts of Britain, and west across Spain. It is named after the type site at Fère-en-Tardenois in the Tardenois region in France, where E. Taté first discovered its characteristic artifacts in 1885.

Characteristic artifacts differ from earlier industries by the presence of geometric microliths, microburin, scalene triangles, trapezoids and chisel-ended arrowheads and small flint blades made by the pressure-technique. The term is also used for several microlithic industries and sites in northern Italy and Eastern Europe and to distinguish the northern French Tardenoisian sites from the Sauveterrian industry in southern France.

The Tardenoisian followed the Ahrensburgian, with which it was paralleled, and lasted from about 9000 BC until 4000 BC (in Britain) in the Neolithic.
