= Fère-en-Tardenois =

- Commune
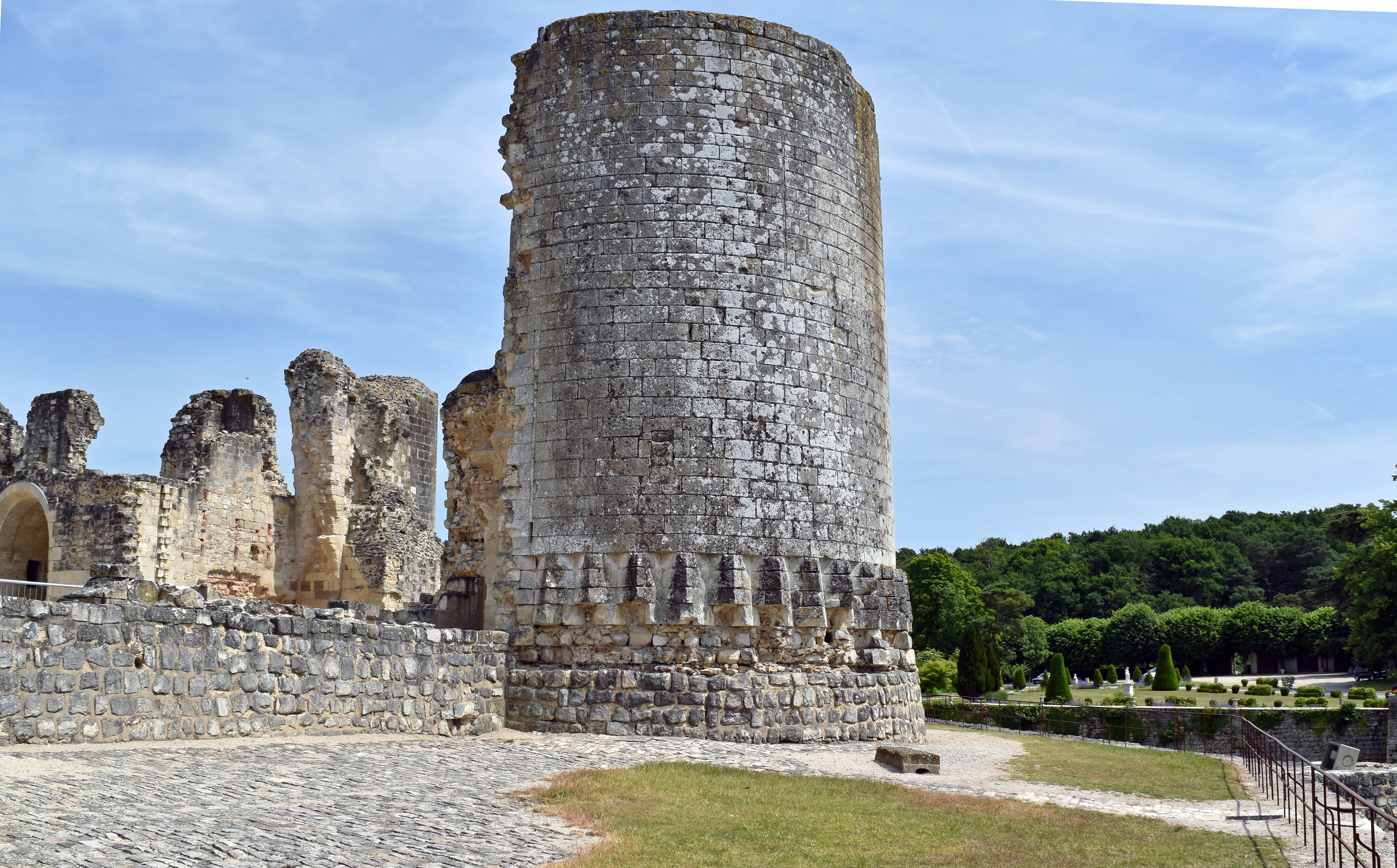
- Ruins of the chateau

- Coat of arms
- Location of Fère-en-Tardenois
- Location within France Location within Hauts-de-France
- Coordinates: 49°11′58″N 3°31′02″E
- Country: France
- Region: Hauts-de-France
- Department: Aisne
- Arrondissement: Château-Thierry
- Canton: Fère-en-Tardenois
- Intercommunality: CA Région de Château-Thierry

Government
  - Mayor (2026–32): Madeleine Duguez-Gabriel
- Area^{1}: 20.4 km^{2} (7.9 sq mi)
- Elevation: 125 m (410 ft)
- Highest elevation: 225 m (738 ft)
- Lowest elevation: 106 m (348 ft)
- Population (2023): 2,836
  - Density: 139/km^{2} (360/sq mi)
- Time zone: UTC+01:00 (CET)
  - Summer (DST): UTC+02:00 (CEST)
- INSEE/Postal code: 02305 /02130
- ^{1} French Land Register data, which excludes lakes, ponds, glaciers > 1 km^{2} (0.386 sq mi or 247 acres) and river estuaries.

Fère-en-Tardenois (French pronunciation: [fɛʁ ɑ̃ taʁdənwa], literally Fère in Tardenois) is a commune in the Aisne department in Hauts-de-France in northern France.

It is named for the Tardenois region.

== Population ==
Historical population

Year	Pop.	±% p.a.
1793	1,852	—
1800	1,796	−0.44%
1806	1,806	+0.09%
1821	2,105	+1.03%
1831	2,313	+0.95%
1836	2,354	+0.35%
1841	2,461	+0.89%
1846	2,410	−0.42%
1851	2,556	+1.18%
1856	2,293	−2.15%
1861	2,497	+1.72%
1866	2,393	−0.85%
1872	2,218	−1.26%
1876	2,367	+1.64%
1881	2,322	−0.38%
1886	2,397	+0.64%
1891	2,265	−1.13%
1896	2,391	+1.09%
1901	2,508	+0.96%

Year	Pop.	±% p.a.
1906	2,690	+1.41%
1911	2,548	−1.08%
1921	2,332	−0.88%
1926	2,476	+1.21%
1931	2,377	−0.81%
1936	2,169	−1.81%
1946	2,140	−0.13%
1954	2,250	+0.63%
1962	2,419	+0.91%
1968	2,730	+2.04%
1975	3,012	+1.41%
1982	3,246	+1.07%
1990	3,168	−0.30%
1999	3,356	+0.64%
2007	3,306	−0.19%
2012	3,191	−0.71%
2017	3,053	−0.88%
2023	2,836	−1.22%

Source: EHESS and INSEE (1968-2023)

== Personalities ==
It was the birthplace of Camille Claudel (1864–1943), sculptor and graphic artist.

== Sights ==
The Château de Fère-en-Tardenois dates originally from 1206, with later important Renaissance alterations.

The Oise-Aisne American Cemetery and Memorial is one and a half miles east of Fère-en-Tardenois. It contains the graves of 6,012 American soldiers who died while fighting in this vicinity during World War I including the poet, Joyce Kilmer and, until 1987, Eddie Slovik, a deserter and the first American soldier to be executed for desertion since the American Civil War.

== See also ==
- Communes of the Aisne department
- Histoire de Fère-en-Tardenois, Tome II
