= Geological history of Europe =

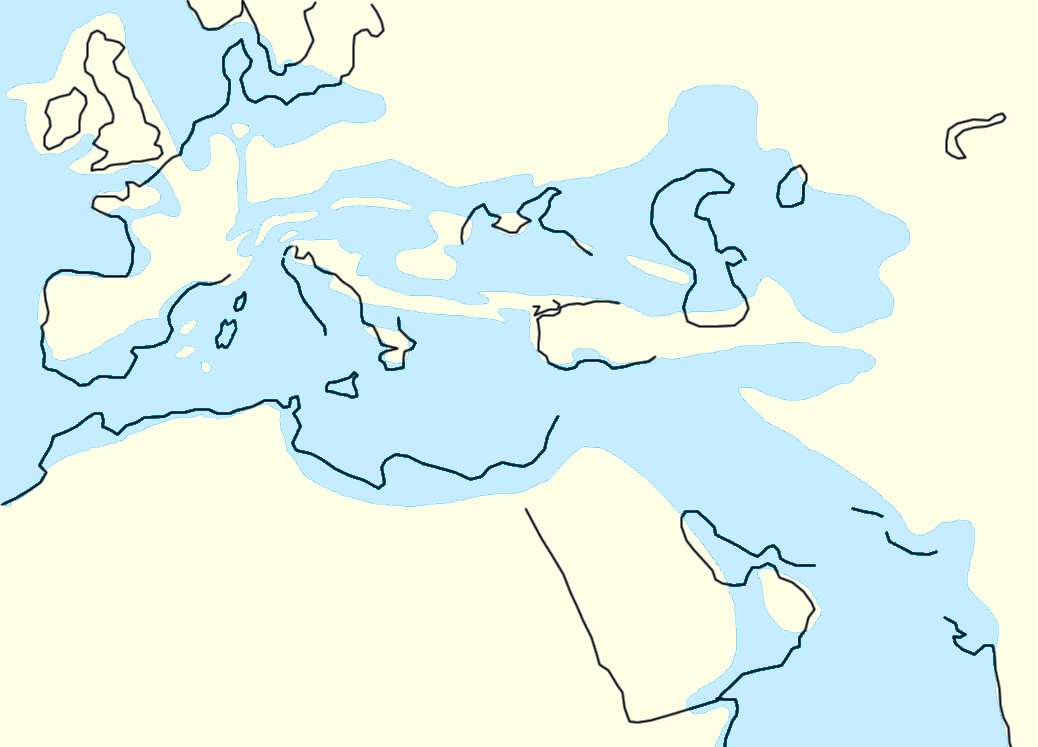
Map of "Europe" in the early Oligocene, some 30 million years ago.

The formation of Europe as a coherent landmass dates to after the breakup of Pangaea, taking place during the Oligocene and completed by the early Neogene period, some 20 million years ago.

== Pre-Pleistocene ==
During the Lower Paleozoic Era, Proto-Europe acquired a large piece of crust, known as East Avalonia, that would eventually become northwestern Scotland. Avalonia itself would eventually separate into the eastern coastal region of North America, divided by the Atlantic Ocean, from southern Ireland, England, Wales, Belgium, and the Netherlands.

Alpine orogeny started as early as the Mesozoic with the formation of the Alpide belt, some 200 Mya. Even earlier orogenies relevant for the ultimate formation of Europe are the Caledonian orogeny, some 400 Mya and the Variscan orogeny, some 300 Mya.

Until the lower Oligocene period, about 32 Mya, the future lands of Europe were an island continent, separated from Asia by a shallow sea, but possessing intermittent land-bridge connections to North America via Greenland. Many animal species from the much larger North America colonized Europe during these times. As sea levels changed and sediments accumulated, the sea between Europe and Asia gradually dried out and Europe became a western appendage of the Earth's largest land mass.

== Pleistocene ==
The Pleistocene epoch lasted from 2.6 million years ago until 12,000 years ago. During this period there were a number of glacial and inter-glacial periods. During the glacial periods there were large drops in sea level, so the coast-line was greatly modified. The final major cold spell occurred from 25,000 to 18,000 years ago and is known as the Last Glacial Maximum when the Fennoscandian ice sheet covered much of northern Europe while the Alpine ice sheet occupied significant parts of central-southern Europe. However, there were several less cold periods after this. The epoch ends with the Younger Dryas when there were small ice sheets in Scotland and Scandinavia.

== Holocene ==
The Holocene has lasted from 12,000 years ago to the present. It can be subdivided into a number of climatic stages: Preboreal, Boreal, Atlantic, Subboreal, and Subatlantic. Its main features have been the rise in sea level and the isostatic recovery from the weight of the ice sheets in the north. This has led to flooding of the continental shelf around the British Isles and may have resulted in the Black Sea becoming saline.

== See also ==
- Alpine orogeny
- European Land Mammal Age
- Paleolithic Europe
- East European craton
- Black Sea deluge theory
