= Château de Fère-en-Tardenois =

Ruined castle in Aisne, Hauts-de-France, France

Coordinates: 49°13′20″N 3°31′55″E

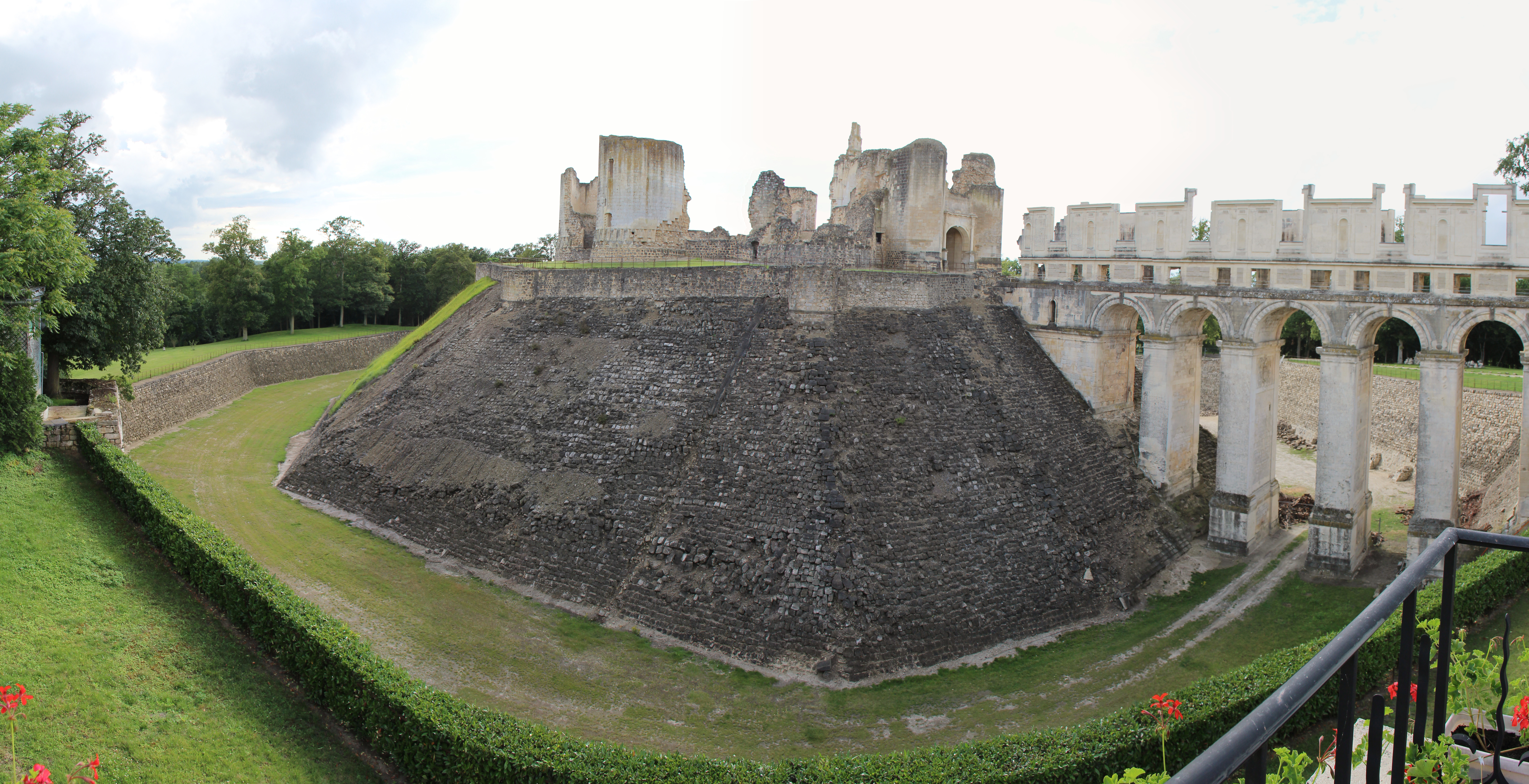
Château de Fère-en-Tardenois

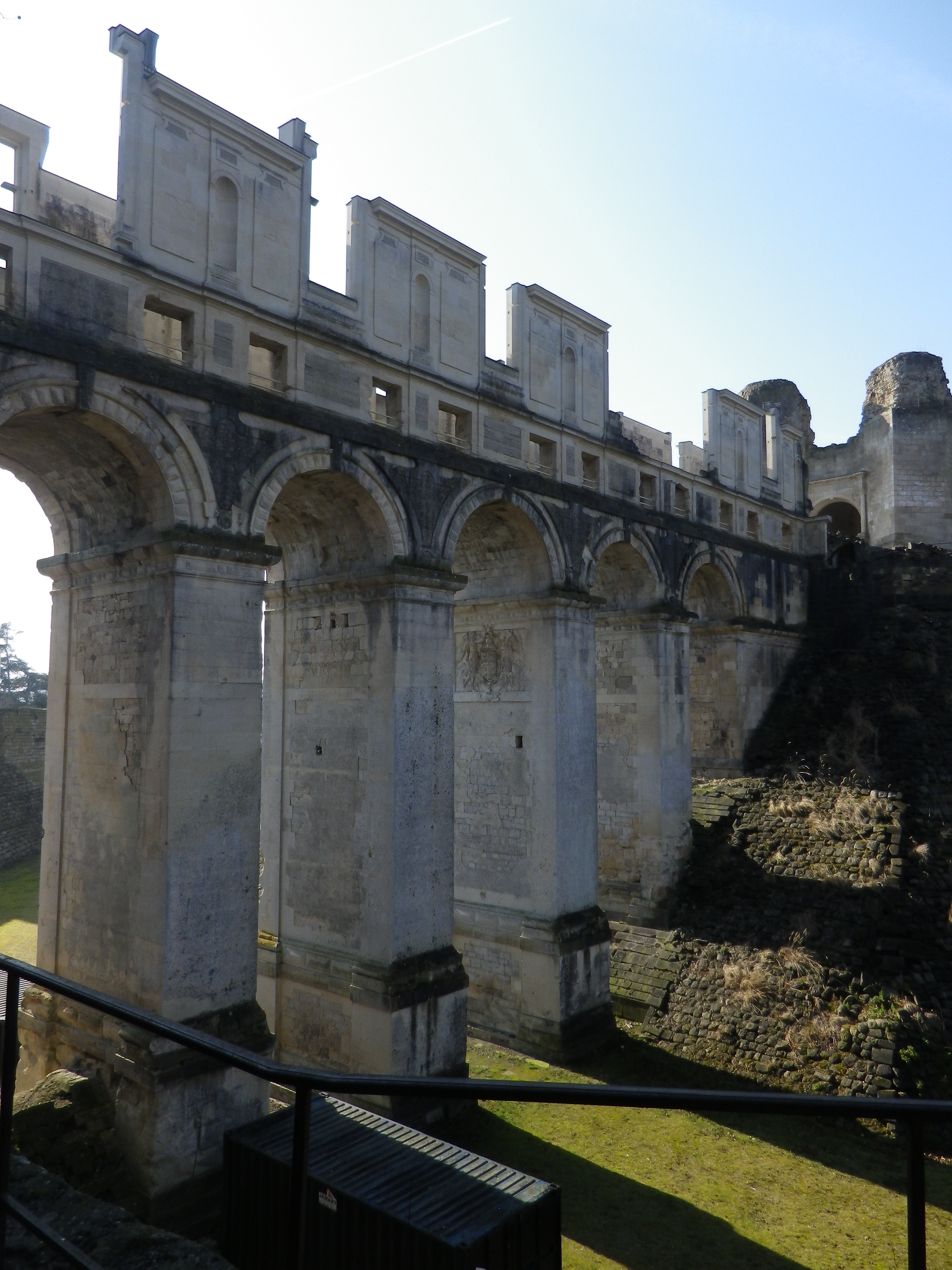
Bridge carrying the covered gallery

The Château de Fère-en-Tardenois is a ruined castle in the commune of Fère-en-Tardenois in the Aisne département of France.

Construction of the original castle began in 1206. Little of that remains today. It had seven towers on an enormous artificial motte whose slopes were covered in slabs of sandstone and served as a model for numerous other castles. The connétable Anne de Montmorency, companion of Francis I, transformed the castle in around 1528. In 1555, he enlarged it with the addition of the famous Renaissance bridge carrying a covered gallery. These works were carried out by the architect Jean Bullant (who constructed the gallery at the Château de Chenonceaux) and, possibly, the sculptor Jean Goujon, which would explain the quality of the sculptures, the stone and the colours.

Ownership of the castle is shared by the département and a private company. It is open to the public. The Château de Fère-en-Tardenois has been listed since 1862 as a monument historique by the French Ministry of Culture.

== See also ==
- List of castles in France
