= Epipalaeolithic =

Period in Levantine history

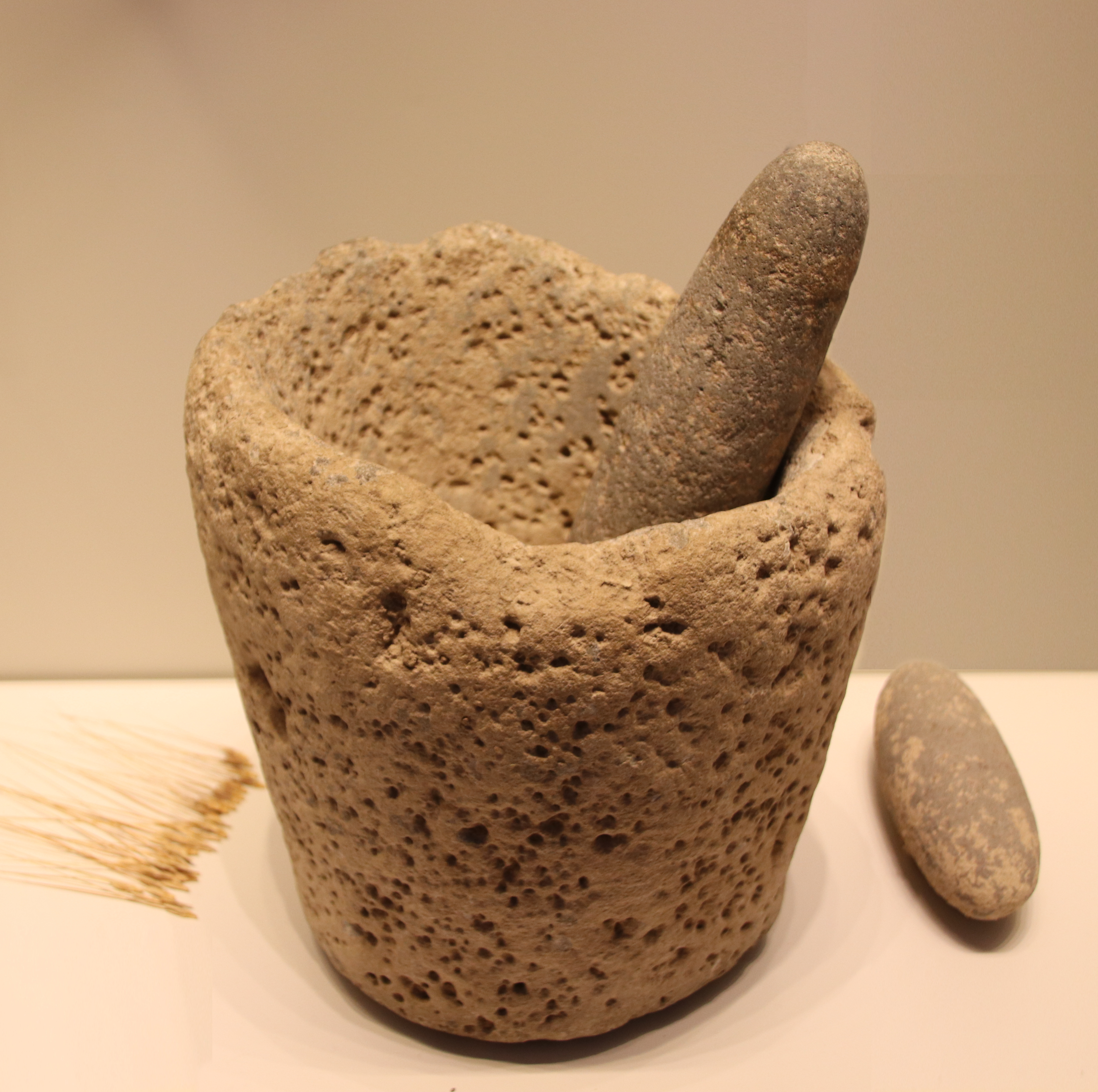
- Epipalaeolithic stone mortar and pestle, Kebaran culture, Epipaleolithic Near East. 22000-18000 BP
- Alternative names: Mesolithic (for Europe)
- Geographical range: Near East
- Period: End of Old Stone Age
- Dates: 20,000 to 10,000 BP
- Preceded by: Levantine Aurignacian (Upper Paleolithic)
- Followed by: Neolithic

In archaeology, the Epipalaeolithic or Epipaleolithic (sometimes Epi-paleolithic etc.) is a period occurring between the Upper Paleolithic and Neolithic during the Stone Age. Mesolithic also falls between these two periods, and the two are sometimes confused or used as synonyms. More often, they are distinct, referring to approximately the same period of time in different geographic areas. Epipaleolithic always includes this period in the Levant and, often, the rest of the Near East. It sometimes includes parts of Southeast Europe, where Mesolithic is much more commonly used. Mesolithic very rarely includes the Levant or the Near East; in Europe, Epipalaeolithic is used, though not very often, to refer to the early Mesolithic.

The Epipalaeolithic has been defined as the "final Upper Palaeolithic industries occurring at the end of the final glaciation which appear to merge technologically into the Mesolithic". The period is generally dated from c. 20,000 BP to 10,000 BP in the Levant, but later in Europe. If used as a synonym or equivalent for Mesolithic in Europe, it might end at about c. 5,000 BP or even later.

In the Levant, the period may be subdivided into Early, Middle and Late Epipaleolithic, the last also being the Natufian. The preceding final Upper Paleolithic period is the Kebaran or "Upper Paleolithic Stage VI".

Epipalaeolithic hunter-gatherers, generally nomadic, made relatively advanced tools from small flint or obsidian blades, known as microliths, that were hafted in wooden implements. There are settlements with "flimsy structures", probably not permanently occupied except at some rich sites, but used and returned to seasonally.

== Term usage ==
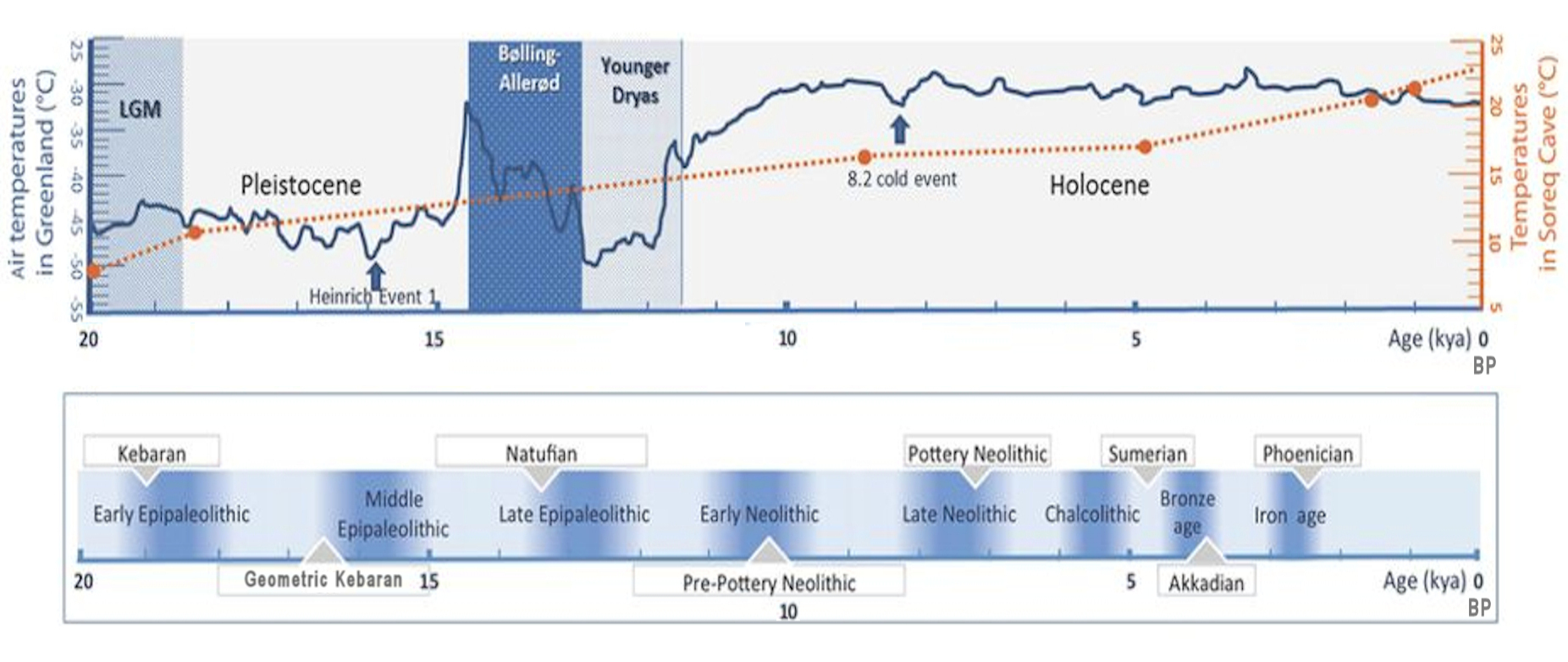
The Epipaleolithic corresponds to the first period of progressive warming after the Last Glacial Maximum. Evolution of temperatures in the Post-Glacial period according to Greenland ice cores.

In describing the period before the start of the Neolithic, "Epipaleolithic" is typically used for cultures in regions that were far from the glaciers of the Ice Age, so that the retreat of the glaciers made a less dramatic change to conditions. This was the case in the Levant. Conversely, the term "Mesolithic" is most likely to be used for Western Europe where climatic change and the extinction of the megafauna had a great impact of the Paleolithic populations at the end of the Ice Age, creating post-glacial cultures such as the Azilian, Sauveterrian, Tardenoisian, and Maglemosian. In the past, French archaeologists had a general tendency to prefer the term "Epipaleolithic" to "Mesolithic", even for Western Europe. Where "Epipaleolithic" is still used for Europe, it is generally for areas close to the Mediterranean, as with the Azilian industry.

"Epipalaeolithic" stresses the continuity with the Upper Paleolithic. Alfonso Moure says in this respect:

In the language of Prehistorical Archaeology, the most extended trend is to use the term "Epipaleolithic" for the industrial complexes of the post-glacial hunter-gatherer groups. Inversely, those that are in transitional ways towards artificial production of food are inscribed in the "Mesolithic".

In Europe, the Epipalaeolithic may be regarded as a period preceding the Early Mesolithic, or as locally constituting at least a part of it. Other authors treat the Epipalaeolithic as part of the Late Palaeolithic; the culture in southern Portugal between about 10,500 to 8,500 years ago is "variously labelled as 'Terminal Magdalenian' and 'Epipalaeolithic'". The different usages often reflect the degree of innovation and "economic intensification in the direction of domestication, sedentism or environmental modification" seen in the culture. If the Palaeolithic way of life continues with only adaptation to reflect changes in the types of wild food available, the culture may be called Epipalaeolithic. One writer, talking of Azilian microliths in Vasco-Cantabria talks of "some exceptions that seem to herald the coming of 'true' Mesolithic technologies a few centuries later". The paleoanthropologist Trenton Holliday refers to a short Epipaleolithic phase in some areas of Europe after the end of the Younger Dryas 11,700 years ago, when in some areas of Europe most stone tools were small versions of Upper Paleolithic ones, before the introduction of Mesolithic technology around 10,000 years ago.

== History of the term ==
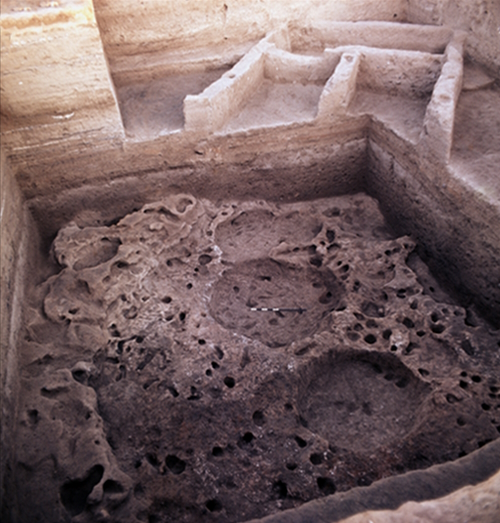
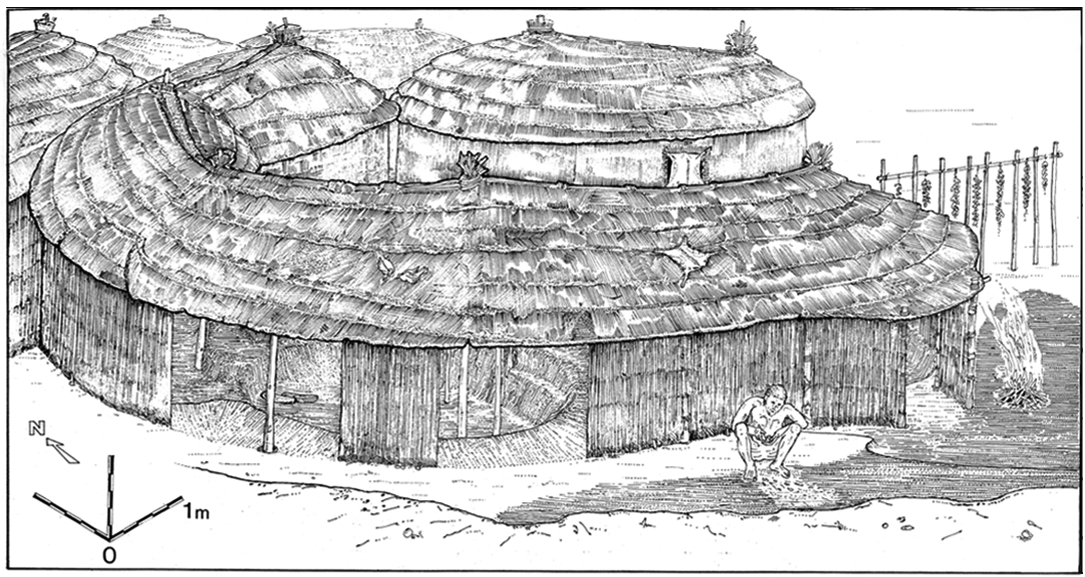
Remain of Epipalaeolithic 1A (13,300-12,800 cal BP) pit dwellings in the foreground, and reconstruction of phase 1A pit dwellings of Abu Hureyra.

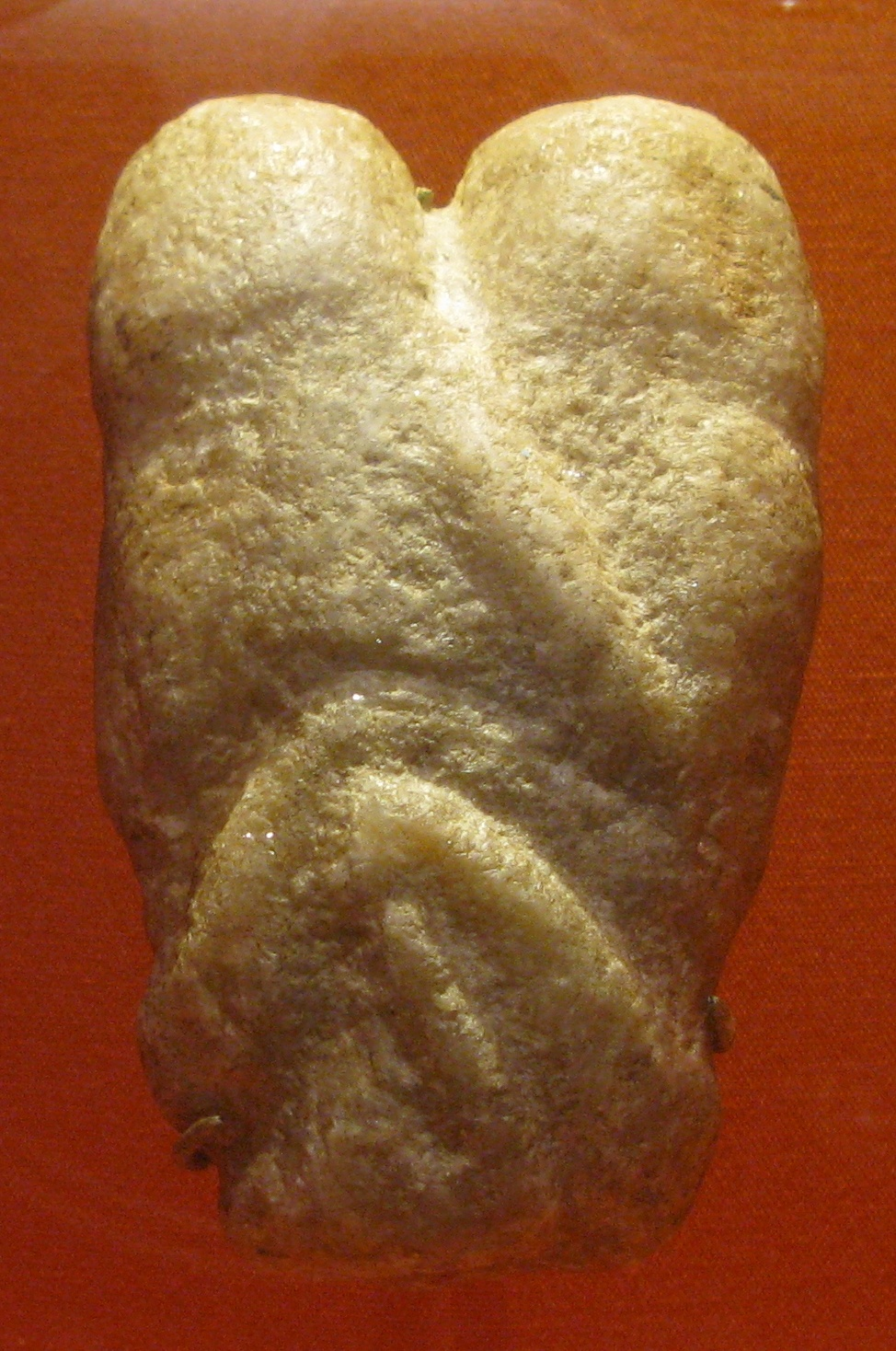
The Ain Sakhri lovers, Ain Sakhri near Bethleem, Israel. Kebaran culture, Late Epipaleolithic Near East

The concept of the "Epipalaeolithic" arrived several decades after the main components of the three-age system, the Paleolithic, Mesolithic and Neolithic. It was first proposed in 1910 by the Swedish archaeologist, Knut Stjerna, his initial example being a culture or sub-culture in Scandinavian archaeology, that would not be often called Epipalaeolithic today. This left stone-lined pit graves containing implements of bone, such as harpoon and javelin heads. Stjerna observed that they "persisted during the recent Paleolithic period and also during the Protoneolithic". Here he had used a new term, "Protoneolithic", which was according to him to be applied to the Danish kitchen-middens. Stjerna also said that the eastern culture "is attached to the Paleolithic civilization" ("se trouve rattachée à la civilisation paléolithique"). However, it was not intermediary and of its intermediates he said "we cannot discuss them here" ("nous ne pouvons pas examiner ici"). This "attached" and non-transitional culture he chose to call the Epipaleolithic, defining it as follows:

With Epipaleolithic I mean the period during the early days that followed the age of the reindeer, the one that retained Paleolithic customs. This period has two stages in Scandinavia, that of Maglemose and that of Kunda. (Par époque épipaléolithique j'entends la période qui, pendant les premiers temps qui ont suivi l'âge du Renne, conserve les coutumes paléolithiques. Cette période présente deux étapes en Scandinavie, celle de Maglemose et de Kunda.)

Stjerna made no mention of the Mesolithic, and it is unclear if he intended his terms to replace that. His new terms were soon adopted by the German Hugo Obermaier, who in 1916 used them in El Hombre fósil (translated into English in 1924) as part of an attack on the concept of the Mesolithic, which he insisted was a period of "transition" and an "interim" rather than "transformation":

But in my opinion this term is not justified, as it would be if these phases presented a natural evolutionary development – a progressive transformation from Paleolithic to Neolithic. In reality, the final phase of the Capsian, the Tardenoisian, the Azilian and the northern Maglemose industries are the posthumous descendants of the Palaeolithic ...

This early history of the term introduced the ambiguity and degree of confusion which has continued to surround its use, at least as relates to the archaeology of Europe.

== Sources ==
- Bailey, Geoff and Spikins, Penny, Mesolithic Europe, 2008, Cambridge University Press, ISBN 0521855039, 978-0521855037
- Holliday, Trenton (2021). Cro-Magnon: The Story of the Last Ice Age People of Europe. New York: Columbia University Press. ISBN 978-0-231-20497-2.
- Simmons, Alan H., The Neolithic Revolution in the Near East: Transforming the Human Landscape, 2007, University of Arizona Press, ISBN 978-0816529667, google books
- Stjerna, Knut (1910). "Les groupes de civilisation en Scandinavie à l'époque des sépultures à galerie". L'Anthropologie (in French). XXI: 1–34.
