= Sauveterrian =

- Alternative names: Sauveterrian culture
- Geographical range: France, Europe
- Period: Mesolithic
- Dates: c. 8500 BC – c. 6500 BC
- Type site: Sauveterre-la-Lémance
- Preceded by: Azilian
- Followed by: Castelnovien culture Tardenoisian culture Maglemosian culture

The Sauveterrian is the name for an archaeological culture of the European Mesolithic which flourished around 8500 to 6500 years BP. The name is derived from the type site of Sauveterre-la-Lémance in the French département of Lot-et-Garonne.

It extended through large parts of western and central Europe. Characteristic artefacts include geometric microliths and backed points on micro-blades. Woodworking tools are notably missing from Sauveterrian assemblages. There is evidence for ritual burial.

== See also ==
- Tardenoisian
