= Genetic history of Pleistocene humans =

Overview of genetic research on Pleistocene epoch archaic and early modern humans"

Modern humans (Homo sapiens) and the ancestors of Neanderthals (Homo neanderthalensis) and Denisovans (Homo denisova) diverged from a common ancestral population between c. 500-700 thousand years ago (kya). Neanderthals and Denisovans subsequently split c. 350-450 kya, with Neanderthals occupying Europe and western Asia until their extinction c. 40 kya, and Denisovans inhabiting regions of central and eastern Asia. By the late Middle Pleistocene, Neanderthals had differentiated into eastern and western populations, undergoing repeated population expansions and replacements that reduced their genetic diversity, whereas Denisovans appear to have been genetically more diverse, forming at least a northern branch and an unsampled southern lineage. Modern humans evolved in Africa by 200 kya at the latest, by which time human populations had already differentiated into several distinct lineages. Early modern human dispersals Out-of-Africa between 130–90 kya reached Southeast Asia and Australia but left no genetic trace in most present-day populations. The major migration Out-of-Africa c. 70–60 kya is the primary source of ancestry in present-day non-African populations.

During their expansion, the Main Eurasian lineage of modern humans admixed with Neanderthals in or near southwest Asia c. 60–50 kya, resulting in c. 2% Neanderthal ancestry in all present-day non-Africans. Some modern human groups subsequently admixed with Denisovans, likely in East Asia, contributing c. 2–3.5% of the ancestry of present day Oceanians, and small amounts to South Asians, East Asians, and Native Americans. Neanderthals and Denisovans also interbred with each other, as shown by a first generation c. 50 kya hybrid individual from Denisova cave. Basal Eurasians, a lineage that diverged from other non-Africans before c. 60 kya, carried little or no Neanderthal ancestry and later contributed to Upper Paleolithic and early Holocene populations in West Eurasia and South Asia, reducing the Neanderthal DNA of these groups and their descendants.

After the initial Out-of-Africa dispersal, the Main Eurasian population likely remained in a single hub for several millennia, possibly in the Middle East or North Africa, before expanding across Eurasia in multiple waves: an early wave that contributed minimally to later populations; an Initial Upper Paleolithic wave (c. 45 kya) which expanded widely across most of Eurasia; and the Early Upper Paleolithic expansion (c. 40 kya) which largely replaced earlier lineages in Europe and admixed with descendants of Initial Upper Paleolithic populations in Siberia, producing lineages ancestral to present-day Europeans, Siberians, and Native Americans. Following the Campanian Ignimbrite eruption (c. 40 kya), Initial Upper Paleolithic lineages in West Eurasia were replaced by populations exhibiting the first significant genetic continuity with modern Europeans. Around the time of the Last Glacial Maximum (c. 25–19 kya), both western and eastern Eurasia underwent major population turnovers. In Europe, post-LGM groups largely replaced previous European populations, while in northern East Asia, late Pleistocene groups were replaced by groups closer to Holocene East Asian populations. By c. 12.5 kya, individuals such as Anzick 1 in Montana were present in the Americas, representing a population that had already diversified into multiple Native American lineages.

== Map ==
Locations of sequenced ancient human individuals, c. 430–11.5 kya

Archaic humans	LGM and Post-LGM Europeans	Ancient Middle East and North Africa
Caucasus Upper Paleolithic	Ancient Native Americans	Initial Upper Paleolithic
Ancient Eurasians (Zlatý Kůň / Ranis)	Ancient East Asians	Ancient Paleo-Siberians
Ancient Northern Eurasians	Ancient Africans	Upper Paleolithic Europeans

== Genomes and populations ==
=== Archaic humans ===
Calabrian bottleneck (c. 930 Kya to 813 Kya)

A genetic study from 2023 of 3154 individuals showed that human ancestors went through a severe population bottleneck with about 1280 breeding individuals between around 930,000 and 813,000 years ago. The bottleneck lasted for about 117,000 years and brought human ancestors close to extinction. This population crash would likely have had an impact on human genetic diversity, and may have driven the evolution of important features of modern humans, such as brain size. The geneticists suggest that the bottleneck may have led to increased inbreeding and a subsequent loss in human genetic diversity that has persisted to this day.

The causes of the bottleneck are unknown.

A 2024 study suggests this might not have happened

==== Sima de los Huesos hominins (c. 430 kya) ====
Meyer et al. (2016) extracted nuclear DNA from two individuals recovered at the Sima de los Huesos site, Atapuerca, northern Spain, dated to around 430 kya. Analysis of their genomes indicates that these individuals were either Early Neanderthals or members of a population ancestral to Neanderthals on a lineage that had already diverged from Denisovans.

Although their nuclear DNA is more closely related to Neanderthals than Denisovans, they carry a divergent mitochondrial DNA lineage that is more closely related to that of Denisovans. This suggests that the original mtDNA lineage of early Neanderthals, such as those from Sima de los Huesos, was later replaced as a result of gene flow from early modern humans from Africa.

==== Denisova 2 Denisovan (c. 250-200 kya) ====
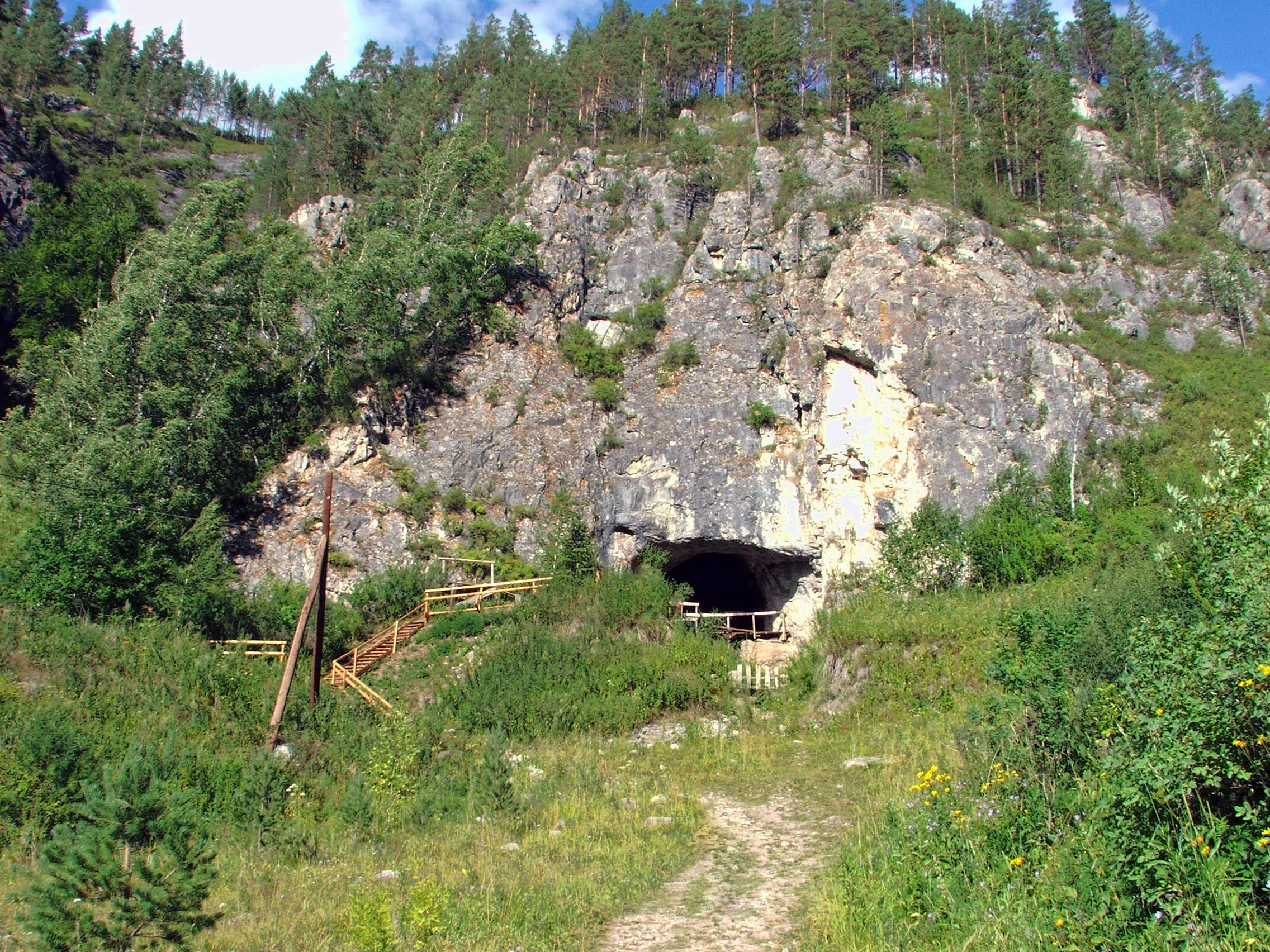
Denisova Cave

Denisova 2 is a female Denisovan sequenced from a molar recovered in the Main Chamber of Denisova Cave, layer 22.1, dated to between 250-200 kya. Her mitochondrial DNA is most closely related to that of Denisova 8. Denisova 2 carried recent Neanderthal ancestry from introgression c. 1,500 years before her lifetime.

==== Denisova Cave Denisovans (c. 200 kya) ====
Denisovan DNA dating to c. 217-187 kya has been extracted from three bone fragments (Denisova 19, Denisova 20, and Denisova 21) recovered from Layer 15 of the East Chamber of Denisova Cave, Siberia. Denisova 19 and 21 have identical mitochondrial DNA sequences, indicating they may represent the same individual or close maternal relatives. Their mtDNA differs from that of Denisova 20 by only four substitutions. All three mtDNA sequences form a clade with Denisova 2 and Denisova 8.

==== Scladina Neanderthal (c. 127 kya) ====
Scladina I-4A is an approximately eight-year-old Neanderthal child sequenced from a maxillary bone recovered from Scladina Cave, Sclayn, Belgium. The nuclear DNA of Scladina is more closely related to Vindija than to the Altai Neanderthal. Scladina is thought to have diverged from the common ancestor of Vindija around 100 kya, close to the estimated divergence time of the Hohlenstein-Stadel (HST) individual. Like HST, Scladina may represent a population that was ancestral to later Neanderthals outside the Altai lineage.

The mitochondrial DNA of Scladina is most similar to that of the Altai Neanderthal and, like HST, belongs to a lineage that is not found among later European Neanderthals.

==== Hohlenstein–Stadel Neanderthal (c. 124 kya) ====
The Hohlenstein–Stadel Neanderthal ('HST') is represented by a femur recovered from Hohlenstein–Stadel cave in southwestern Germany within a Mousterian context. The nuclear DNA of HST is more closely related to the Western Neanderthal lineage (e.g. Vindija) than to the eastern Altai Neanderthal lineage. HST is estimated to have diverged from its common ancestor with Vindija around 100 kya and may represent a population ancestral to all currently sequenced Neanderthals outside the Altai lineage.

HST carries the most deeply divergent Neanderthal mtDNA lineage sequenced to date, estimated to have diverged from other Neanderthal mtDNA lineages around 270 kya. A closely related mitochondrial DNA lineage has been identified at a c. 112 kya layer of the Galería de las Estatuas site, Spain, but this lineage is not found in the site's upper layers, suggesting it was later replaced by lineages related to Mezmaiskaya I, Vindija, and Chagyrskaya.

==== Stajnia S5000 Neanderthal (c. 116 kya) ====
Stajnia S5000 is a Neanderthal sequenced from a molar recovered from Stajnia Cave in Poland, associated with Micoquien artefacts. The archaeological layer is at least 49 thousand years old, and the individual has been genetically dated to c. 116 kya.

The mitochondrial DNA of Stajnia S5000 belongs to a clade that diverged from Denisova 5, Denisova 15, and Scladina around 170 kya, and is most closely related to the Mezmaiskaya 1 Neanderthal from the North Caucasus. It falls outside the range of variation observed in other European Neanderthal mtDNA lineages, including Scladina and Hohlenstein-Stadel.

==== Denisova 5 Neanderthal (c. 110.5 kya) ====
Denisova 5, also known as the 'Altai Neanderthal', is an adult female sequenced from a toe phalanx recovered from Denisova Cave, Siberia. Her nuclear DNA represents the most deeply divergent Neanderthal lineage sequenced to date, other than the Sima de los Huesos hominins. Genetic studies indicate that late Neanderthals split into eastern and western populations, with Denisova 5 representing the eastern branch and Vindija 33.19, a c. 44 kya individual from Croatia, representing the western branch. The Denisova 5 lineage is estimated to have diverged from other Neanderthal populations around 150 kya.

Denisova 5 descended from a population with a small effective population size. Long runs of homozygosity indicate that inbreeding was common among her recent ancestors, including her parents, who were second-degree relatives, such as half-siblings or double first cousins. Polygenic predictions suggest that Denisova 5 was at elevated genetic risk for a range of conditions including cancer, gastrointestinal and liver diseases, immune system and neurological disorders, metabolic conditions, and muscular abnormalities.

Her mitochondrial DNA belongs to the more typical, non-HST Neanderthal lineage. Andreeva et al. (2022) assign Denisova 5 to the NE clade, along with Denisova 15 and Scladina I-4A. This haplogroup was likely widespread among Middle Paleolithic Neanderthals in Europe and Central Asia.

Approximately 3.7% of the Denisova 5 genome derived from early modern humans, although she was not closely related to the Neanderthal population that contributed DNA to the ancestors of present-day humans.

==== Denisova 11 Denisovan-Neanderthal hybrid (c. 98.7 kya) ====
Denisova 11 ("Denny") is a female individual sequenced from a small bone fragment recovered from the East Chamber of Denisova Cave, Siberia, dated to around 118–79 kya. Denisova 11 was the first-generation offspring of a Denisovan father and a Neanderthal mother. Her father was a Denisovan but also carried traces of Neanderthal ancestry from one or more Neanderthal ancestors who lived approximately 300 to 600 generations before his lifetime. Her father's Neanderthal ancestry was genetically more similar to Denisova 5 than that of her mother, who was more closely related to Chagyrskaya 8 and Vindija 33.19. This difference in parental ancestry suggests that a population turnover occurred among Neanderthal populations in the Altai mountains prior to Denisova 11's lifetime.

==== Mezmaiskaya Neanderthals (c. 97–50 kya) ====
Genetic data from three Neanderthal individuals has been recovered from Mezmaiskaya cave, North Caucasus, Russia. Mezmaiskaya 1, a near-complete skeleton of a two-week old child (c. 70–60 kya), and Mezmaiskaya 3, a 5–6 year old female (c. 90–100 kya), are both from layer 3 and associated with the early Eastern Micoquien industry, and represent an earlier lineage. The third individual, Mezmaiskaya 2, is more closely related to other late Western European Neanderthals.

Mezmaiskaya 1 and Mezmaiskaya 3 are most closely related to Stajnia S5000. Mezmaiskaya 3 shows greater affinity to Chagyrskaya 8 and Vindija 33.19 than to the Altai Neanderthal, sharing c. 17% of derived alleles with Chagyrskaya 8 and c. 13% with Vindija 33.19. Both individuals are assigned to the NM2 mitochondrial haplogroup by Andreeva et al. (2022), which falls outside the variation of later European Neanderthals. Mezmaiskaya3, Mezmaiskaya1, and Stajnia S5000 belong to a mtDNA clade that is separate from that of Altai, Denisova 15, and Scladina I-4A.

==== Chagyrskaya 8 Neanderthal (c. 80 kya) ====
Chagyrskaya 8 is a female Neanderthal from Chagyrskaya Cave in the Altai Mountains, genetically dated to c. 80 kya, though the Micoquien archaeological layer she is associated with dates to around 60 kya. She is more closely related to Neanderthals from western Eurasia such as Vindija than to the earlier Altai Neanderthal from the nearby Denisova Cave, which is located about 100 km away, suggesting that her population was part of an eastward Neanderthal expansion that occurred around 120–80 thousand years ago.

Chagyrskaya 8 is the closest known relative to the mother of Denisova 11, the Denisovan-Neanderthal hybrid. Her genome contains approximately 12.9% of regions homozygous by descent, consistent with descent from a small, isolated population of fewer than 60 individuals.

==== Denisova 3 Denisovan (c. 64 kya) ====
Denisova 3, a female estimated to have been around 13 years old at the time of her death, was recovered from the East Chamber of Denisova Cave, Siberia in 2008. Molecular dating places her between around 76–52 kya. Analysis of her nuclear and mitochondrial DNA provided the first genetic evidence of an archaic human group, subsequently named Denisovans.

Denisova 3 carried lower levels of Neanderthal ancestry than Denisova 2 and Denisova 8, with at least 0.5% of her genome deriving from a lineage similar to that of Denisova 5 (the 'Altai Neanderthal'). Her genome exhibits low heterozygosity, suggesting that she belonged to a population with small effective size, but she carried few long runs of homozygosity, indicating that less inbreeding occurred in her ancestral population compared with Neanderthals.

Denisova 3 carried genetic variants that in modern humans are associated with dark skin, brown hair, and brown eyes, along with other derived pigmentation alleles with unknown effects. She also carried genetic variants linked to dental morphology, impulsivity, cerebral cortex development, hand structure, and nasal speech, as well as a nonfunctional FUT2 gene, which may have provided protection against intestinal viral infections.

Present-day East Asians, Siberians, and Native Americans carry ancestry closely related to Denisova 3, resulting from admixture between Denisovans and the ancestors of these groups. The limited geographical distribution of Denisova 3-related ancestry in present-day human populations suggests that this admixture occurred in mainland Asia, possibly in East Asia.

==== Vindija 33.19 Neanderthal (c. 52 kya) ====
Vindija 33.19 is a female Neanderthal from Vindija Cave, Croatia, dated to c. 52 kya. Her genome represents the 'Western' Eurasian Neanderthal population, which diverged from the 'Eastern' Altai lineage c. 130-145 kya, and subsequently from the Mezmaiskaya (Caucasus) lineage between c. 80–100 kya. Vindija 33.19 is genetically more similar to the Neanderthals who interbred with the ancestors of non sub-Saharan African present-day humans than the Altai Neanderthal.

Her genome carried c. 2.5% modern human ancestry, similar to that of the Altai Neanderthal, suggesting that gene flow from early modern humans into Neanderthal populations occurred prior to the separation of eastern and western Neanderthal lineages. Low heterozygosity in the Vindija 33.19 genome indicates that she belonged to a relatively small and isolated population, though it was likely larger than those of the Chagyrskaya and Altai Neanderthals.

==== Gibraltar Neanderthals (c. 50 kya) ====
The Gibraltar Neanderthals are represented by two partial crania: Gibraltar 1, an adult female from Forbes' Quarry; and Gibraltar 2, a 3-to-5 year-old male child, from Devil's Tower.

Gibraltar 1 is equally closely related to Vindija 33.19 and Chagyrskaya 8, but less closely related to the Altai Neanderthal. She is genetically more similar to older Neanderthals such as Scladina, HST, and Mezmaiskaya 1, than to roughly contemporaneous individuals such as the c. 49 thousand year-old El Sidrón 1253. Her divergence from Vindija 33.19 is estimated at around 94 kya, and from Chagyrskaya 8 at around 101.6 kya.

The mitochondrial DNA of Gibraltar 1 clusters with Thorin, Stajnia S5000, and Mezmaiskaya 1. Andreeva et al. (2022) place her within the NM1 haplogroup, together with Stajnia S5000. Gibraltar 1 and Thorin form a distinct mtDNA clade, and the close genetic relationship between these individuals suggests that Gibraltar Neanderthals may have been a part of a larger interconnected Neanderthal population in southwest Europe.

==== El Sidrón Neanderthals (c. 49 kya) ====
The El Sidrón site in northern Spain, dated to c. 49 kya, has yielded the remains of at least 13 Neanderthal individuals, who form a closely related group.

The Y chromosome of El Sidrón 1253 is most closely related to that of Thorin, while his mitochondrial DNA clusters with other late European Neanderthals. The mtDNA haplotypes of the El Sidrón Neanderthals suggests male philopatry: all males share a closely related mtDNA lineage, whereas three out of four females carried mtDNA lineages originating from outside the group. One female had the same mtDNA haplotype as two juveniles, suggesting they may have been her children. The El Sidrón Neanderthals exhibit a higher proportion of runs of homozygousity than the Vindija, Altai, and Denisova Neanderthals, indicating a long history of inbreeding.

Two individuals carried a version of the FOXP2 gene associated with language ability, identical to the version found in modern humans. One individual carried a variant of the MC1R gene, suggesting that some Neanderthals had pale skin and red hair, and El Sidrón 1253 also carried a variant of the TAS2R38 gene, making them sensitive to bitter tasting compounds.

==== Goyet Neanderthals (c. 45.5–40.5 kya) ====
The Goyet Caves in Belgium were excavated in the late 19th and 20th centuries, revealing evidence of Middle and Upper Paleolithic human occupation associated with the Mousterian, Lincombian-Ranisian-Jerzmanowician, Aurignacian, Gravettian, and Magdalenian industries. The Goyet Neanderthals are dated to c. 40.5–45.5 kya, though the remains may represent a single occupation of c. 44–45.5 kya

Their mitochondrial DNA is most closely related to central and western European late Neanderthal mtDNA lineages such as that carried by Feldhofer 1, El Sidron, and Vindija. All these sequences exhibit only minor genetic variation, consistent with a low effective population size among late Neanderthals. Three distinct mtDNA lineages have been identified among the Goyet Neanderthals: Goyet Q305-4, who forms a clade with Feldhofer 2; Goyet Q56-1, Q374a-1, and Q305-7, who form a clade with Vindija; and Goyet Q57-3, Q57-1, and Q57-2, who form a clade with Feldhofer 1.

==== Okladnikov Cave Neanderthals (c. 44 kya) ====
Three Neanderthal individuals associated with a Mousterian context have been recovered from Layer 3 of Okladnikov Cave, in the Altai Mountains of southern Siberia. These are Okladnikov 2 (also known as Okladnikov 14), Okladnikov A (or Okladnikov 11), a 7–11 year old male represented by a partial femur, and Okladnikov B (or Okladnikov 15), an adult female represented by a humerus fragment.

The Okladnikov individuals were genetically distinct from the Neanderthals at nearby Chagyrskaya Cave, although both groups were equally closely related to European Neanderthals. Late European, Chagyrskaya and Okladnikov Neanderthals are thought to be descendants of a common Neanderthal population that expanded rapidly across Eurasia between c. 100-115 kya.

Okladnikov 2 carries a mitochondrial DNA lineage basal to that of Mezmaiskaya 1, while Okladnikov B carried an identical mtDNA haplotype to that of Chagyrskaya G, suggesting that these individuals lived within a few thousand years of each other.

==== Mezmaiskaya 2 Neanderthal (c. 43 kya) ====
Mezmaiskaya 2, a 1–2 year old male child from layer 2 of Mezmaiskaya cave, Russia, is associated with the later Eastern Micoquien, and has been directly dated to c. 44.4–42.6 kya.

Mezmaiskaya 2 is more closely related to other late Western Neanderthals than with the earlier population represented by Mezmaiskaya 1 and Mezmaiskaya 3 from the same site. He is assigned to the NL1 mtDNA haplogroup, shared with other late Neanderthals in Western and Central Europe, by Andreeva et al.

==== Les Cottés Neanderthal (c. 43 kya) ====
The Les Cottés Neanderthal ('Les Cottés Z4-1514'), is a female individual from Les Cottés cave, France, dated to c. 43.7–42.7 kya. She is genetically closer to Vindija 33.19 than to the Altai Neanderthal, and shows highest affinity to the nearby Goyet Q56-1 and Spy 94a Neanderthals. She is less closely related to the Mezmaiskaya Neanderthals: among the late Neanderthals, Les Cottés Z4-1514 is the most genetically distant individual from Mezmaiskaya 2. Her genome shows evidence of gene flow from an unsampled lineage that diverged from the most recent common ancestor of the European Neanderthals over 80 kya.

According to Andreeva et al. (2022), Les Cottés Z4-1514 carries the NL2 mitochondrial haplogroup, a sister clade to other late Neanderthals.

==== Grotte Mandrin Neanderthal (c. 42 kya) ====
A male Neanderthal from Mandrin Cave, France ('Thorin'), dated to c. 42 kya and associated with the Post-Neronian II tradition, belonged to a distinct Neanderthal lineage that diverged from the main ancestral European Neanderthal population c. 100 kya. D-statistics indicate that his lineage diverged before other late Neanderthals of the Vindija lineage, with the possible exception of the Forbes' Quarry Neanderthal, who shares some excess alleles with Thorin. Thorin's genome did not show evidence of recent gene flow from modern humans.

Thorin exhibits elevated homozygosity compared to other late European Neanderthals, consistent with recent inbreeding and descent from a small population that was genetically isolated for up to 50,000 years. His mitochondrial DNA was most closely related to the Stajnia S5000, Mezmaiskaya 1, and Forbes' Quarry individuals, and distinct from other late European Neanderthals. His Y-chromosome diverged from a lineage ancestral to Spy94a and Mezmaiskaya 2, forming a clade with the earlier Chagyrskaya Neanderthals. Thorin's Y-chromosome is closest to El Sidrón 1253.

==== Feldhofer Neanderthals (c. 40 kya) ====
The Feldhofer Neanderthals, Feldhofer 1 and Feldhofer 2, were discovered in Feldhofer Cave in the Neander Valley, Germany, dated to c. 40 kya. Feldhofer 1 provided the first published Neanderthal (mitochondrial) DNA sequence. Both Feldhofer individuals are associated with the Micoquien industry. They are assigned to the NL1 mtDNA haplogroup by Andreeva et al. (2022), along with other Late European Neanderthals.

==== Spy I Neanderthal (c. 39 kya) ====
Spy 94a, an upper right molar from Spy I, is one of 2 incomplete adult Neanderthal skeletons discovered in Spy Cave, Belgium. The tooth, directly associated with Mousterian tools, is dated to c. 39.2–37.9 kya.

The nuclear DNA of Spy 94a is most closely related to Vindija 33.19. His Y-chromosome haplogroup forms a clade with Mezmaiskaya 2, while his mtDNA is closely related to Goyet Q56-1, Goyet Q305-7, and Goyet Q374a-1. Like other late Neanderthals, Spy 94a shows low levels of heterozygosity, consistent with small effective Neanderthal population sizes near the end of their history.

=== Modern humans ===
==== Ancient southern African Hunter-Gatherers (c. 200-160 kya) ====
Ancient southern African Hunter-Gatherers (AncSA) represent one of the earliest branches of modern humans, estimated to have diverged from all other lineages around the same time as central African rainforest Hunter-Gatherers, c. 200-160 kya, and possibly even earlier, c. 270 kya. The AncSA lineage subsequently split into northern and southern lineages sometime between 170–30 kya.

This lineage is not directly represented by any ancient or present day individuals. The closest available proxies are c. 2 kya hunter-gatherers from Ballito Bay, Faraoskop rock shelter, and St. Helena. The AncSA lineage was likely widespread in southern Africa, and may have been the only human population in southern Africa for most of the prehistoric period. Their present-day descendants in southern Africa, the Khoisan, carry some of the most deeply divergent human lineages and the highest number of unique genetic variants of any human populations, reflecting this early separation. The Khoisan carry ancestry primarily derived from a population that separated from ancient southern African foragers c. 20–30 kya, with an additional c. 9–22% mixed Eurasian-East African ancestry introduced during the spread of farming into southern Africa.

==== Ancient central African rainforest Hunter-Gatherers (c. 200 kya) ====
Central African Rainforest Hunter-Gatherers (CRHGs) are one of the earliest diverging modern human lineages. They are inferred to have split from other human populations c. 200-160 kya, and perhaps as early as c. 220 kya. This lineage is not directly represented by any ancient or present day individuals. The Mbuti are their closest representatives among present-day populations.

The CRHG lineage subsequently diverged into eastern (represented by the Mbuti) and western (represented by the Aka) branches between roughly 50–31 kya, with further differentiation within the western lineage occurring c. 18–12 kya. Ancient individuals from Malawi (I2967, c. 8.2 kya) and perhaps Kenya (I8930, c. 4.5 kya) carry mitochondrial DNA lineages typical of present-day central African foragers such as Mbuti and Aka.

==== Ancient eastern African Hunter-Gatherers (c. 140–70 kya) ====
Ancient eastern African Hunter-Gatherers (closest to Hadza and Sandawe among present-day humans) split from all other African populations c. 140–70 kya. The c. 4.5 kya Mota individual from Ethiopia and the present day Hadza represent an ancient East African lineage that is more closely related to non-African populations than any other major African lineage.

==== Basal Eurasians (c. 80 kya) ====
Basal Eurasians are a currently unsampled ('ghost') postulated lineage of modern humans that diverged from all other non-African populations before these groups differentiated from one another. This split likely occurred shortly after the main Out-of-Africa expansion and before the major Neanderthal admixture event into the Main Eurasian population, possibly as early as 80 kya. The geographical origin of the Basal Eurasian lineage is uncertain, with proposed homelands including the Arabian Peninsula, Southwest Asia, or North Africa.

Basal Eurasians remained isolated from other Eurasian populations until c. 25 kya at the latest, when they are observed admixing with other groups in the Middle East. The earliest traces of Basal Eurasian ancestry are found in Upper Paleolithic individuals from Georgia (c. 26 kya), Morocco (c. 15 kya), and the Satsurblia cluster in the Caucasus (c. 13–9 kya). By the Holocene, this component was widespread in the ancient Near East, contributing c. 44% of the ancestry in Natufians and c. 66% in Mesolithic Iranians. It later spread into Europe with the expansion of early Neolithic farmers.

In present-day populations, Basal Eurasian ancestry is highest in the eastern Arabian Peninsula (c. 45%), followed by Iran (c. 38%), the Levant (c. 32%), the Caucasus (c. 20–25%), and Europe (under c. 20%). Because the Basal Eurasian lineage had little, if any, Neanderthal admixture, populations with higher proportions of Basal Eurasian ancestry, such as early Near Easterners and some modern Middle Eastern groups, tend to have reduced levels of Neanderthal DNA.

==== Main Eurasians (c. 80–54 kya) ====
Genetic evidence suggests that the ancestral Out-of-Africa population remained largely isolated for a prolonged period, perhaps between c. 82–55 kya in refugia such as now-submerged areas such as the Arabian Gulf or the Red Sea, or in southern Iran. Around 80 kya, this population divided into two lineages: the Basal Eurasians, and the Main Eurasians who subsequently admixed with Neanderthals and expanded rapidly across Eurasia, reaching Europe by c. 54 kya and Australia by c. 50 kya.

According to Vallini et al. (2024), the Persian Plateau functioned as a major population hub for the Main Eurasian population during the early stages of the Out-of-Africa dispersal. In their model, the Main Eurasian population occupied this region between the time of the initial migration Out-of-Africa and the colonization of Eurasia. From this hub, successive population waves are thought to have originated: an early wave before c. 45 kya, represented by Zlatý kůň; a later Initial Upper Paleolithic ('East Eurasian Core') expansion c. 45 kya (represented by Bacho Kiro, Tianyuan, and the ancestors of most present-day East Asians and Oceanians); and an Upper Paleolithic ('West Eurasian Core') expansion c. 40 kya (represented by Kostenki 14, Sunghir, and later West Eurasians).

The relatively high proportion of Neanderthal ancestry in present-day populations indicates that the Main Eurasian group was small, consistent with having only two mitochondrial lineages (haplogroups M and N).

==== Zlatý kůň and Ranis (c. 50–42 kya) ====
The Zlatý kůň woman, a near-complete skull discovered in Koněprusy Caves, Czech Republic, along with six individuals from Ilsenhöhle in Ranis, Germany associated with the Lincombian-Ranisian-Jerzmanowician culture, are dated to c. 49.5–42 kya. These individuals represent a distinct population that separated from other non-African lineages earlier than any previously analysed individual, preceding the split between East and West Eurasians. Outgroup f₃-statistics indicate that Zlatý kůň, together with Bacho Kiro IUP, Ust'Ishim, and Oase 1, comprise a distinct, 'pre-40 kya' genetic group.

Some of the Ranis individuals were close kin: Ranis 6 was the daughter of Ranis 4, while Ranis 12 was a second- or third-degree relative of Ranis 4. Zlatý kůň was a fifth or sixth degree relative of both Ranis 12 and Ranis 4, and more distantly related to the other Ranis individuals. Long runs of homozygosity in Ranis 13 and Zlatý kůň suggest that these individuals were part of a population with recent low effective population size, and indicate consanguinity in their recent ancestors.

Ranis and Zlatý kůň lacked genetic variants for lactose tolerance, light skin, and light hair. Neanderthal ancestry was estimated at around 2.9% in the Ranis13 and ZKU individuals, with longer Neanderthal-derived segments than in other contemporaneous individuals.

Bennett et al. (2023) found support for gene flow from Zlatý Kůň into Early to Middle Upper Paleolithic individuals, including Buran-kaya, and the Fournol and Věstonice clusters. Other studies have concluded that the population represented by Ranis and Zlatý kůň, like Ust'-Ishim and Oase1, did not contribute genetically to later Eurasians.

==== Bacho Kiro Initial Upper Paleolithic (c. 46–43 kya) ====
Human remains from the Initial Upper Paleolithic layers (IUP) of Bacho Kiro cave, near Dryanovo, Bulgaria, are associated with the Bachokirian or Pre-Aurignacian industry, and are dated to c. 45.9–42.6 kya. The Bacho Kiro IUP individuals form a distinct genetic cluster, more closely related to ancient and present-day East Asians than to Europeans. Their presence in Europe from 45 kya has been interpreted as part of a broader Initial Upper Paleolithic population expansion, originating from the Persian Plateau and extending eastward as far as Tianyuan.

Vallini et al. (2022) model the Bacho Kiro IUP lineage as a sister group to Tianyuan Man, and suggest that Bacho Kiro IUP, Tianyuan, and Ust'-Ishim may have shared a brief evolutionary history. Hajdinjak et al. (2021) found support for gene flow from the lineage represented by Bacho Kiro IUP to Ust'-Ishim, Tianyuan, and GoyetQ116-1. Alternatively, Meier et al. (2023) suggest that the apparent genetic connection between Bacho Kiro IUP and Tianyuan may not reflect a direct relationship, and that instead, the shared ancestry could be the result of sequential expansions of modern humans out of West Asia, first contributing to Bacho Kiro, then to early East Asians, followed by Ust'-Ishim, and lastly to later European hunter-gatherers.

Vallini et al. (2022) also suggest that a Bacho Kiro IUP-like population contributed the majority of the ancestry of the Oase 1 individual, with Oase 1 receiving additional Neanderthal admixture. Trace Bacho Kiro IUP-related ancestry has been proposed to be present in a later Early Upper Paleolithic individual ('BK1653') from the same site, as well as in members of the Fournol cluster.

The Bacho Kiro IUP individuals carried unusually high Neanderthal ancestry ranging from 3.0–3.8%. All three Bacho Kiro IUP individuals analysed by Hajdinjak et al. (2021) had Neanderthal ancestors within a few generations of their lifetimes.

==== Ust'-Ishim (c. 42 kya) ====
Ust'-Ishim man is represented by a near-complete femur discovered along the Irtysh River, near Ust' Ishim, Siberia, dated to c. 42 kya. He belonged to a population that diverged from the ancestors of East and West Eurasians either before or around the time of their separation. This population can be described as forming a near-trifurcation with West Eurasian (Kostenki 14) and East Eurasian (Tianyuan) groups, possibly representing a basal split on the lineage leading to Bacho Kiro IUP and Tianyuan Man.

Ust'-Ishim man carried Neanderthal admixture at levels similar to that of present day populations, but with significantly longer Neanderthal-derived segments, indicating recent admixture. His mtDNA lies at the root of haplogroup R, which is widespread across present-day Eurasia, while his Y-chromosome was ancestral to haplogroup K(xLT).

==== Basal East Asian (c. 40–33 kya) ====
Basal East Asian ancestry, also called 'Tianyuan' or 'Tianyuan/AR33K' ancestry, is represented by two early modern humans from China: Tianyuan man (c. 40 kya) from Tianyuan Cave, Zhoukoudian; and AR33K, (c. 33 kya) from the Amur River region. These individuals form a distinct genetic cluster that is basal to later East Asian populations. This ancestry was likely widespread in northern East Asia before the Last Glacial Maximum, but was later replaced by other lineages such as that represented by the AR19K individual.

Tianyuan Man is more closely related to present-day East Eurasians, Oceanians, and Native Americans than to modern Europeans, and shows greatest similarity to East and Southeast Asians. While not directly ancestral to present-day East or Southeast Asians, Tianyuan man represents a population that diverged early from the ancestors of these groups. He shares excess alleles with Native American groups, particularly Amazonians, and also shares excess alleles with Goyet Q116-1, which may be explained by their common shared ancestry with populations such as Bacho Kiro Initial Upper Paleolithic. His mitochondrial DNA belongs to a lineage ancestral to haplogroup B, widespread among present-day Asian and Native American populations.

AR33K, who lived around 7,000 years later and over 1,000 km northeast of Tianyuan carried similar ancestry, but has less affinity to Goyet Q116-1 and no excess affinity to Amazonians than to other Native American groups.

Both Tianyuan Man and AR33K had elevated Denisovan-related ancestry compared to later individuals from this region.

==== Oase 1 (c. 40 kya) ====
Oase 1 is a male sequenced from a mandible discovered at Peștera cu Oase, Romania, directly dated to c. 40 kya with no clear archaeological context.

Oase 1 is not closely genetically related to ancient or present-day East Asians or Europeans, although he shows some affinity to present day East Asian and Native American populations. Prüfer et al. (2021) place Oase 1 basal to the divergence of East and West Eurasians. Alternatively Vallini et al. (2022) model Oase 1 as deriving the majority of his ancestry (97%) from Bacho Kiro IUP, with the remaining 3% from recent Neanderthal admixture. Oase 1 is closely related to Muierii2, a c. 33 kya individual from Romania.

Oase 1 carries 6.0–9.4% Neanderthal ancestry, significantly higher than the levels found in present-day Eurasians, indicating a recent Neanderthal ancestor within the last 4 to 6 generations, or less than 200 years before he lived. His mitochondrial DNA belongs to a basal lineage of macrohaplogoup N, and his Y-DNA falls within haplogroup F.

==== Oase 2 (c. 38 kya) ====
Oase 2 is represented by a near-complete cranium discovered at Peștera cu Oase, Romania. The remains are dated to c. 38 kya and not associated with any archaeological culture.

Oase 2 was genetically related to, but distinct from, the population represented by Oase 1 and, like Oase 1, is not closely related to present-day populations. Siska concludes that Oase 2 belonged to a population that formed an outgroup to the ancestors of present-day non-African human populations, but was more closely related to the ancestors of Asians and Native Americans than to Europeans. Compared with Oase 1, Oase 2 shows slightly more affinity to Asian and Native American populations.

Oase 2 carried a basal mitochondrial lineage of macrohaplogoup N and carried 6.06% Neanderthal-related ancestry, lower than Oase 1 but still high compared to contemporaneous individuals.

==== Kostenki 14 (c. 38 kya) ====
Kostenki 14 ('Markina Gora') is the skeleton of a 20–25 year old male discovered along the Middle Don at the Kostyonki–Borshchyovo site in Russia, directly dated to c. 38.7–36.2 kya.

He represents the earliest known example of the West Eurasian Core population (genetically closer to present-day European populations than to East Asians) which replaced earlier European lineages after the Heinrich Stadial 4 cold period that followed the Campanian Ignimbrite eruption. His lineage diverged from East Eurasians and Ust' Ishim by 45 kya, subsequently separating from the Sunghir lineage. Kostenki 14 ancestry later contributed to the Věstonice cluster in Europe, and to ancient populations in Siberia, represented by the Mal'ta and Yana individuals.

At Kostyonki–Borshchyovo, groups closely related to Sunghir, represented by Kostenki 12, likely replaced populations represented by Kostenki 14 by c. 31 kya.

==== Buran-Kaya (c. 37–36 kya) ====
The remains of two male individuals, BuKa3C (c. 37 kya) and BuKa3A (c. 36 kya) were recovered from the Early Upper Paleolithic layers of the Buran-Kaya III rock shelter, Crimea. These layers have been variously interpreted as 'proto-Gravettian', early Gravettian, or part of a non-Aurignacian Caucasus-related culture.

BuKa3A and BuKa3C were closely genetically related but were not genetically uniform, reflecting complex population dynamics during the 1,000-year interval separating them. Both individuals are more similar to post-38 kya Europeans than to pre-40 kya individuals. Bennett et al. model both individuals as primarily descending from a population ancestral to Kostenki-14 and Sunghir-3 (83% for BuKa3A and 94% for BuKa3C), with the remainder from a population related to Zlatý kůň. However Sümer et al. (2024) did not find support for Zlatý kůň/Ranis-like ancestry contributing to these individuals.

BuKa3C carried a mitochondrial DNA lineage that was basal to haplogroup U. His Y-chromosome DNA was a basal branch of F. BuKa3A carried an early branch of mtDNA haplogroup N1, and carried Y-chromosome haplogroup CT. Neanderthal ancestry was estimated at c. 3.8% in BuKa3A and 2.2% in BuKa3C, indicating no recent admixture.

BuKa3A and BuKa3C share the most genetic drift with the later Gravettian-associated Fournol and, to a lesser extent, Věstonice clusters, with Fournol being more closely-related to BuKa3A than to BuKa3C.

==== Goyet Q116-1 and Goyet Q376-3 (c. 37–36 kya) ====
Two individuals, Goyet Q116-1 (male, c. 36.8–36.3 kya) and Goyet Q376-3 (female, c. 37.2–36.5 kya) were recovered from the Goyet Caves in Belgium, in an Aurignacian context.

Goyet Q116-1 is genetically closer to European populations than to East Asians, but carries an East Asian (Initial Upper Paleolithic) substrate. He shares more alleles with Tianyuan Man than any European individual sequenced to date. The affinity between Goyet Q116-1 and Tianyuan may reflect the presence of Asian-related populations in Europe, such as the c. 45 kya Bacho Kiro individuals from Bulgaria, during the early Upper Paleolithic.

Goyet Q116-1 can be modelled as mainly Kostenki14/Sunghir-related ancestry (c. 71%) with an additional Bacho-Kiro IUP-related component (c. 29%). Vallini et al. (2022) model the main IUP component in Goyet Q116-1 as Tianyuan-related, with a small contribution from a Bacho Kiro IUP-related source. Both Goyet individuals are closely related to the Gravettian-associated Fournol cluster.

The genome of Goyet Q116-1 has extremely high levels of runs of homozygosity, suggesting the population he belonged to went through a strong population bottleneck during its expansion to Central Europe. He carried Y-DNA haplogroup C1a2 and mtDNA haplogroup M. Goyet Q376-3 carried mtDNA haplogroup U2.

==== Bacho Kiro Early Upper Paleolithic (c. 36–34 kya) ====
Two bone fragments from Bacho Kiro cave, Bulgaria, BK-1653 (c. 34.7–34.4 kya) and F6-597 (c. 35.8–35.3 kya), represent a population distinct from the earlier Bacho Kiro Initial Upper Paleolithic individuals. Unlike the IUP group, BK-1653 is more closely related to post-38 kya ancient and present-day Europeans than to East Asians. Hajdinjak et al. (2021) model BK-1653 as deriving the majority of her ancestry (c. 97%) from a population related to the Goyet Q116-1 individual. According to Posth et al. (2023), BK-1653 is best described as mainly descending from a Sunghir-related lineage (87%), with a minority contribution from an unsampled lineage ancestral to Zlatý kůň and all European hunter-gatherers (13%). It has been suggested that a lineage related to BK-1653 contributed ancestry to the Věstonice cluster.

BK-1653 carried 1.9% Neanderthal-related ancestry, a similar level to present-day human populations.

==== Sunghir (35–33 kya) ====
Ancient DNA has been recovered from four individuals associated with two burials at the Sunghir site, Russia: an adult male (Sunghir1, c. 33.2 kya), two male children (Sunghir2 and Sunghir3, both c. 34.5 kya), and Sunghir4, an adult male (c. 34.3 kya).

The Sunghir individuals form a distinct genetic clade, showing affinity to Kostenki 14, Kostenki 12, and the Věstonice cluster, and, like these groups, they are more closely related to present-day West Eurasians than to East Asians. Along with Kostenki 14, the Sunghir lineage is an early representative of the West Eurasian Core population. Sikora et al. (2017) model the Sunghir group as descending from a population closely related to Kostenki 14, diverging from the lineage ancestral to present-day Europeans c. 38 kya.

Analysis of homozygous-by-descent (HBD) segments suggests that the ancestors of the Sunghir individuals may have practiced exogamy to avoid inbreeding. Like other Paleolithic West Eurasians and Siberians, all four Sunghir individuals carried mitochondrial DNA haplogroup U. The Y-chromosome of all Sunghir individuals belonged to an early lineage of haplogroup C1a2. Haplogroup C1 is rare among present-day Europeans but is also found in Kostenki 14.

The Věstonice cluster has been modelled as deriving the majority (c. 56%-84%) of its ancestry from the Sunghir lineage, with the remainder attributed to Villabruna or Bacho Kiro UP related sources.

==== Salkhit (c. 34 kya) ====
Salkhit, a female from Salkhit Valley, northeastern Mongolia, dated to c. 34 kya, represents an early East Asian population. She is more closely related to modern East Eurasians and Native Americans than to West Eurasians. Salkhit is closely related to the AR33K and Tianyuan individuals, but shows greater affinity to West Eurasian populations as a result of admixture from a West Eurasian-like source in her ancestral population.

Salkhit derives c. 75% of her ancestry from a Tianyuan-related source, with the remaining 25% from a population related to the c. 32 kya Ancient North Siberian individuals from the Yana Rhinoceros Horn Site, who themselves are a mixture of East and West Eurasian ancestry, providing evidence of early gene flow from West Eurasia to East Asia before c. 34 kya.

Salkhit carries c. 1.7% Neanderthal ancestry and elevated Denisovan-related ancestry that is distinct from the Denisovan ancestry found in present-day Oceanian populations.

==== Peștera Muierilor (c. 34–33 kya) ====
Ancient DNA has been recovered from Peștera Muierilor, Romania, tentatively associated with the Aurignacian. These genomes, Peștera Muierii 1 (PM1) and Peștera Muierii 2 (PM2), both genetically female, may represent the same individual or closely related individuals.

PM1 is genetically intermediate between early Eastern European groups such as Sunghir and Kostenki 14, and Western European populations, such as Goyet Q116-1. She is distantly related to later post-LGM Europeans, such as Loschbour (Oberkassel cluster), and she represents a population that is similar to, but not directly ancestral to, modern Europeans. Svensson et al. (2021) model PM1 as deriving 69% of her ancestry from a Sunghir3-related lineage, and 31% from Goyet Q116-1.

PM1/PM2 carries mtDNA haplogroup U6*, a basal form of a lineage which is found in ancient and present-day North Africans, but rare in modern Europeans. PM1 has c. 3.1% Neanderthal ancestry, similar to other Early Upper Paleolithic individuals, with no evidence of recent Neanderthal admixture.

==== Cioclovina 1 (c. 33 kya) ====
Cioclovina 1 is a male individual recovered from Peștera Cioclovina Uscată, southern Transylvania, Romania, dated to c. 33–31.8 kya with no clear archaeological context. Chronologically, Cioclovina falls between the late Aurignacian and the beginning of the Gravettian. Cioclovina1 shares genetic drift with West Eurasians, and is equally related to Goyet Q116-1 and Sunghir. Cioclovina carried Y-chromosome haplogroup CT, and mitochondrial DNA haplogroup U.

==== Ancient North Siberians (c. 32 kya) ====
Ancient North Siberian (ANS) ancestry is represented by two male individuals, Yana 1 and Yana 2, recovered from the Yana Rhinoceros Horn Site in northeastern Siberia, Russia, dated to c. 31.9 kya. ANS ancestry is one of the two main Upper Paleolithic lineages of northeastern Eurasia, alongside Tianyuan-related ancestry.

The ANS lineage diverged from West Eurasians c. 39 kya, around 4–5 thousand years after the split between West and East Eurasians, and subsequently received gene flow from an East Asian (Tianyuan-like) source. The Yana individuals are genetically similar to other Upper Paleolithic Siberian individuals such as Mal'ta (MA1), Afontova Gora 2, and Afontova Gora 3, collectively known as Ancient North Eurasians. Sikora et al. (2019) describe the ANS individuals as roughly two-thirds Early West Eurasian and one-third Early East Eurasian, with MA1 modelled as a direct descendant of the ANS lineage that received minor gene flow from Caucasus Hunter-Gatherers. Vallini et al. (2022) instead propose that the Yana and MA1 lineages arose from two separate admixture events, each receiving approximately equal East and West Eurasian contributions.

The genomes of the Yana individuals show no signs of recent inbreeding, indicating descent from a relatively large effective ancestral population of up to 500 individuals, and suggesting the existence of long-distance mating networks among pre-LGM hunter-gatherers. They exhibit broad genetic affinity with present-day populations in northern Eurasia and the Americas, although the population represented by Yana does not appear to have contributed directly to them. Osada and Kawai report a weakly significant similarity of the Yana individuals with both Jōmon and present-day Japanese people.

Both individuals belonged to mitochondrial DNA haplogroup U, common among West Eurasian hunter-gatherers, and both carried Y-DNA haplogroup P1, which is ancestral to haplogroups Q (common in Native Americans) and R (common in West Eurasians). Their genomes contain c. 2% Neanderthal DNA, consistent with other Upper Paleolithic individuals.

==== Kostenki 12 (c. 31 kya) ====
Kostenki 12 is the remains of a perinatal child from the Voronezh region of Russia, dated to c. 33–32 kya and possibly associated with the Gorodtsovian culture. Genetically, Kostenki 12 is more closely related to the Sunghir individuals than to Kostenki 14.

==== Věstonice Cluster (c. 31–29 kya) ====
The Věstonice cluster, named after the Dolní Věstonice site in the Czech Republic, represents the eastern half of the two genetic groups associated with the Gravettian culture, alongside the western Fournol cluster. The genetic distinction between the Věstonice and Fournol clusters corresponds with regional differences in Gravettian funerary practices. The Věstonice cluster includes individuals from central-eastern and southern European sites from Italy to the Czech Republic, including Dolní Věstonice, Pavlov, Krems-Wachtberg, Paglicci, and Ostuni.

The Věstonice cluster can be described as a mixture of western European (Goyet-Q116-1 related) and eastern European (Sunghir/Kostenki14-related) lineages. Věstonice individuals are closely related to Sunghir and Kostenki 12, and less closely related to Goyet Q116-1. Posth et al. model the Věstonice cluster as 64% Sunghir-related, with a 36% contribution from a lineage ancestral to Goyet Q116-1. Minor affinities with populations in the Near East have been suggested, and it has been proposed that Věstonice shares some of its ancestry with the Villabruna cluster. By c. 27 kya, Gravettian-associated individuals carrying mixed Fournol and Věstonice ancestry were found at sites such as the Goyet Caves in Belgium, indicating a western expansion of Věstonice-related populations before the Last Glacial Maximum.

Mitochondrial haplogroup U was predominant among individuals of the Věstonice cluster, and Y-chromosome haplogroup C was found at high frequency.

==== Fournol (c. 31–21 kya) ====
The Fournol cluster is represented by Gravettian-associated individuals from southwestern and western Europe, from sites including Fournol, Ormesson, La Rochette, and Serinyà Cave. The earliest individual assigned to this cluster is Ormesson 2988 from northeast France, dated c.31 kya, associated with the Early to Middle Gravettian.

The Fournol cluster is closely related to the c. 35 kya Aurignacian-associated individuals from Goyet Caves, Belgium (Goyet Q116-1 and Goyet Q376-3). Posth et al. (2023) model Fournol as a sister lineage to Goyet Q116-1. Bennett et al. (2023) suggest that Fournol ancestry may include a Zlatý Kůň-related component.

During the Last Glacial Maximum, Fournol groups retreated to refugia in southern France and Iberia, where the Solutrean culture developed, and later admixed with Villabruna-related groups to form the Magdalenian-associated Goyet-Q2 and Iberian Hunter-Gatherer (El Mirón) groups. The Goyet Q2 cluster can be modelled as deriving the majority (71–81%) of its ancestry from Fournol, with a smaller (19–29%) contribution from the Villabruna cluster.

Like Goyet Q116-1 and Goyet Q376-3, Fournol individuals carried mitochondrial DNA haplogroup M, which disappears from Europe after the Last Glacial Maximum.

==== Borsuka Cave (c. 31 kya) ====
The remains of an infant girl (c. 12–18 months old) were recovered from Borsuka Cave, in the Szlarka River valley, southern Poland. Radiocarbon dating places her at c. 31.3–30.3 kya, while molecular dating of her mitochondrial DNA suggests an earlier date, c. 33.5 kya.

The Borsuka girl clusters with other Upper Paleolithic West Eurasians and plots close to modern West Eurasians in principal component analysis. According to f₃-statistics the Borsuka individual shows highest genetic affinity with Bacho Kiro 1653, followed by Muierii, Věstonice16, and Sunghir3. Fewlass et al. found no significant difference in affinity between the Borsuka girl and the Vestonice, Sunghir, BK-1653, and Muierii genomes. She does not display any detectable Basal Eurasian ancestry.

Like the Muierii individual, the Borsuka girl carried mtDNA basal to haplogroup U6. Haplogroup U6 is most common in North Africa among present-day populations.

==== Goyet Gravettian (c. 28–26 kya) ====
The Goyet Gravettian cluster (also called the 'Věstonice/Fournol' cluster) is a genetically distinctive Gravettian-associated population from the Goyet site in Belgium, dated to c. 28–26 kya. These individuals carry mixed ancestry from both the Central European Věstonice cluster and the Western European Fournol cluster. The Goyet Gravettian individuals occupy a genetically intermediate position between these two clusters, indicating the westward expansion of populations carrying Věstonice-associated ancestry between the Early and Late Gravettian, resulting in a genetic continuum (cline) across Europe prior to the LGM.

==== Caucasus Upper Paleolithic (c. 28–25 kya) ====
The Caucasus Upper Paleolithic (Caucasus UP) or 'Dzudzuana-related' cluster is represented by four pre-LGM individuals from the southern Caucasus in northwest Georgia: two from Dzudzuana Cave (I2949 and I2963, 27.5–25.2 kya), one from Satsurblia Cave (SAT29, 25.1–24.8 kya), and one from Kotias Klde Cave (NEO283, 26.0–25.2 kya).

The Caucasus UP cluster descends primarily from the same Western Eurasian source as the Villabruna cluster, but derives c. 25% of its ancestry from the Basal Eurasian ghost population. F₃-statistics with present-day populations indicate that Caucasus UP (SAT29) shows highest affinities with western Eurasians, especially western and northern Europeans.

The descendants of the Caucasus UP lineage contributed substantially to Post-LGM West Eurasian groups, including Western and Eastern European Hunter-Gatherers, Caucasus Hunter-Gatherers, and Early European Farmers. Caucasus UP provided the majority of the ancestry in later Anatolians, smaller proportions in Caucasus Hunter-Gatherers, and diluted levels in early Iranian farmers. Some Caucasus UP ancestry may have reached Eastern and Scandinavian Hunter-Gatherers before the Neolithic expansions.

==== Ancient North Eurasians (c. 25–17 kya) ====
Ancient North Eurasians (ANE) were first proposed to explain genetic links between present-day Native American and European populations, and their existence was confirmed with the sequencing of the Mal'ta boy ('MA1'), a male child from near Lake Baikal dated to c. 24 kya. Other Upper Paleolithic Siberians representing Ancient North Eurasian ancestry include two individuals from the Afontova Gora site (AG2, a male, c. 17 kya, and AG3, a female, c. 18 kya), and DCP1 (a female recovered from Denisova Cave, c. 24.7 kya). The genome of Tutkaul 1, a Neolithic individual from Tajikistan, is closely related to the Ancient North Eurasians.

The ANE lineage formed through admixture between West Eurasian (Kostenki14-related) and East Eurasian (Tianyuan-related) sources, with estimates of the East Eurasian contribution ranging from 29% to 50%. ANE ancestry is similar to Ancient North Siberian ancestry (Yana UP), and it has been suggested that the ANE lineage descends directly from an ANS-like population. Alternatively, Vallini et al. (2022) model MA1 as resulting from a separate admixture event, with equal contributions from East and West Eurasian lineages.

During the LGM, ANE populations spread widely across Eurasia. They mixed with East Eurasians to form the ancestors of Native Americans and Ancient Paleo-Siberians, and admixed with Villabruna-related groups to form Eastern Hunter-Gatherers. ANE groups later contributed to Middle Holocene Altai Hunter gatherers, West Siberian Hunter-Gatherers, Neolithic Iranians (who were approximately half Ancient North Eurasian and half Basal Eurasian), and they contributed the majority of the ancestry of the Bronze Age Tarim Basin mummies. Early Inner Eurasian genomes form a cline of Ancient North Eurasian ancestry that ranges from lowest in Western European Hunter-Gatherers to highest in Paleolithic Siberians around Lake Baikal.

Ancient North Eurasian ancestry is found in substantial levels among present-day Native American, Siberian, European, and South Asian populations. Over half of the present day human population carries between 5 and 40% ANE ancestry, and according to Wong et al. (2017), Western Siberians derive c. 57% of their ancestry from this lineage.

MA1 carries a basal lineage of Y-chromosome haplogroup R*. The mtDNA of MA1 falls within haplogroup U but belongs to a lineage that is rare or extinct in present-day populations. Haplogroup U was highly frequent (over 80%) among Upper Paleolithic and Mesolithic European hunter-gatherers, and is today widespread across North Africa, the Middle East, South and Central Asia, western Siberia, and Europe, but is uncommon in the Mal'ta region.

The earliest evidence for the KITLG variant associated with blond hair in Europeans comes from the Ancient North Eurasian individual Afontova Gora 3. The allele later appears in Mesolithic individuals from Samara, Motala, and Ukraine, as well as in groups with Steppe ancestry.

==== Basal Americans (c. 26.1–23.9 kya) ====
The admixture of Ancient North Siberians (ANS) with East Asian groups before the Last Glacial Maximum, either near Lake Baikal or further north in western Beringia, produced at least two distinct lineages: Ancient Paleo-Siberians (APS), ancestral to present-day northeastern Siberian groups; and Basal Americans, whose descendants later migrated across Beringia into the Americas. Although the exact timing and location of the formation of the Basal American branch remains uncertain, it must have formed by c. 21–20 kya at the latest, since it had already split into distinct populations by that time. Native Americans derive entirely from ANS and East Asian sources, suggesting that the Basal American branch became geographically isolated, perhaps in western Beringia or farther south.

This scenario is consistent with the Beringian standstill hypothesis, which proposes that an ancestral population remained isolated in Beringia during the LGM before dispersing into the Americas. From the Basal American population emerged several lineages: an unsampled 'ghost' population ('UPopA'); Ancient Beringians; and Ancestral Native Americans (ANA), who subsequently split into Northern Native American and Southern Native American branches c. 17.5–14.6 kya. The deep divergence and subsequent limited gene flow between these groups implies multiple separate migrations into North America.

Moreno-Mayar et al. (2018) model the hypothetical Basal American lineage as c. 60% East Asian and 40% Ancient North Eurasian.

==== Unsampled Population A (c. 24.7 kya) ====
Unsampled population A ('UPopA') is a ghost population inferred from genomic studies of Mesoamericans and South American Native American populations. UPopA is a proposed outgroup to Ancient Beringians, North Native Americans, and South Native Americans, inferred to be most closely related to Native American populations. UPopA is thought to have split from Native Americans c. 30–22 kya. They are believed to have emerged, perhaps in Beringia, from a 'Basal American' population that was also ancestral to Ancient Beringians and Ancestral Native Americans, before subsequently migrating into the Americas.

==== Cueva del Malalmuerzo (c. 23 kya) ====
MLZ, a male recovered from Cueva del Malalmuerzo, Spain, dates to c. 23 kya and is associated with a Solutrean archaeological context. MLZ is genetically intermediate between the Aurignacian-associated Goyet Q116-1 and the Magdalenian-associated Goyet Q2 cluster individuals, showing closer affinity to Goyet Q2. MLZ connects earlier pre-LGM Aurignacian-associated populations to post-LGM Magdalenian groups in western Europe, providing additional evidence for population continuity in Iberia.

MLZ also shares ancestry with an early Eurasian population that predates the separation of European and East Asian lineages, a group that includes the Goyet Q116, Tianyuan, and Bacho Kiro IUP individuals. Additionally, MLZ carries ancestry that shows affinity to both Natufians and Villabruna, a profile that became more common in post-LGM populations.

MLZ carries mtDNA haplogroup U2'3'4'7'8'9, which is also found in other southwestern European individuals, and Y-chromosome haplogroup C1, also found in the Bacho Kiro IUP group. More basal forms of haplogroup C occur in Paglicci133, Cioclovina1, and Kostenki12, while the derived haplogroup C1a2 is found in the Goyet Q116-1 and Sunghir individuals.

==== Minato 1 (c. 20 kya) ====
The remains of Minato 1 were recovered from the Minatogawa site on Okinawa Island, Japan, directly dated to c. 19.9 kya. Minato 1 has been described as a possible descendant of the earliest modern humans to settle the Japanese archipelago.

Minato 1 carried a lineage of mitochondrial haplogroup M which is not found in present-day populations, and basal to the mtDNA haplogroups later found in Jōmon and mainland East Asia. This suggests that Minato 1 belonged to a population that was ancestral to both present-day Japanese and other East Asian populations. However, the mtDNA of Minato 1 does not cluster with later Jōmon, Yayoi, or modern Japanese samples, suggesting Minato 1 is not directly ancestral to these groups.

==== Goyet Q2 cluster (c. 20.5–14 kya) ====
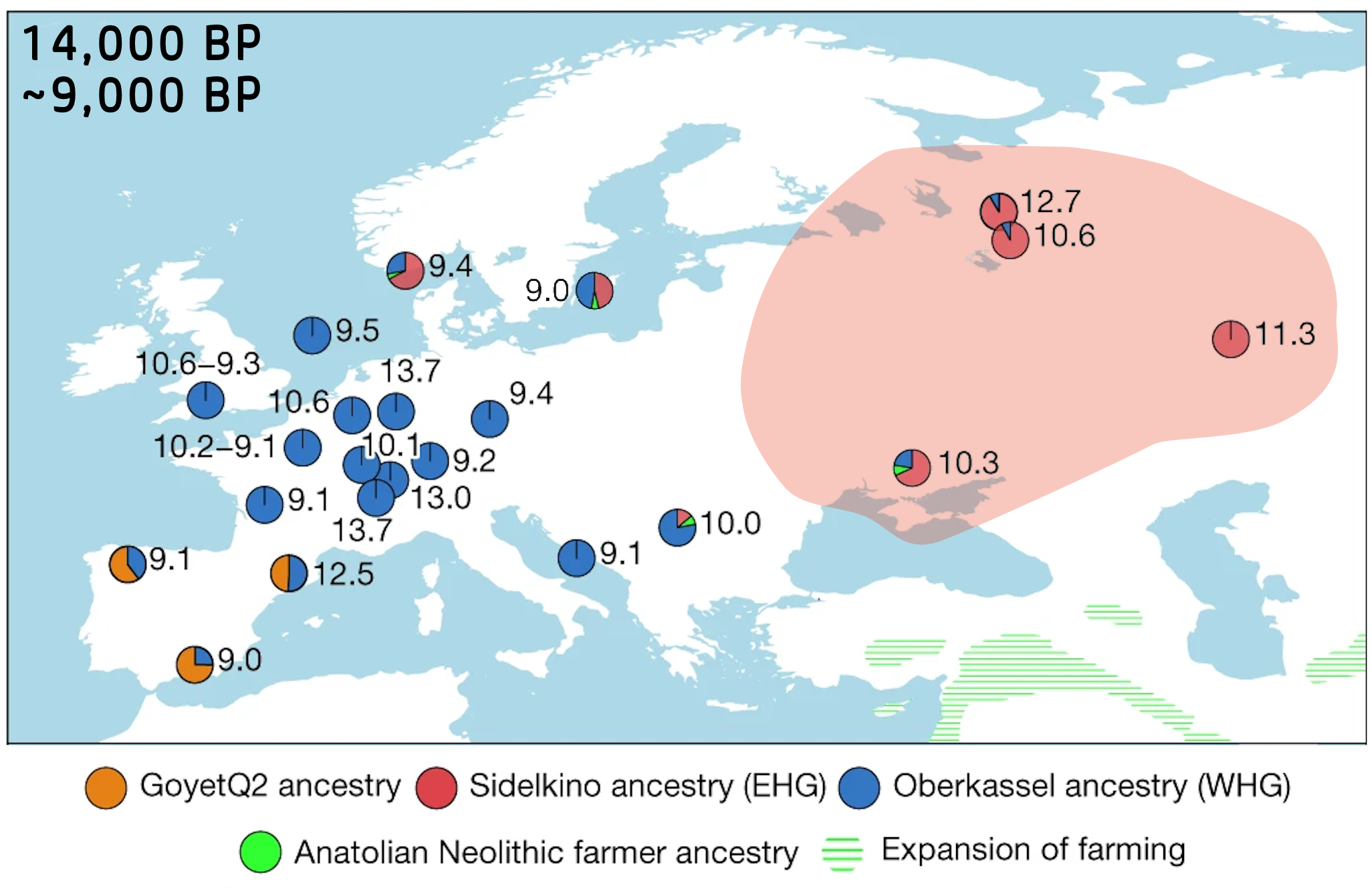
European hunter gatherer ancestry, c. 14-9 kya

The Goyet Q2 cluster is represented by individuals associated with the Magdalenian culture dating to c. 20.5–14 kya, distributed from western France to Poland. It includes individuals such as Goyet Q2 (Belgium, c. 15 kya), Hohle Fels 49 (Germany, c. 14.7 kya), Rigney 1 (France, c. 15.5 kya), Burkhardtshöhle (Germany, c. 14.6 kya), and Gough's Cave (England, c. 15–14.6 kya).

The GoyetQ2 cluster can be modelled as 71–81% Fournol and 19–29% Villabruna related ancestry. Unadmixed Goyet Q2 cluster individuals are found in Northern Europe until c. 14 kya, possibly expanding from a southwest European glacial refugium.

Following the Bølling-Allerød warming (c. 14 kya), GoyetQ2 ancestry in central Europe was largely replaced by Villabruna-related populations. Iberian Hunter-Gatherers, however, retained significant proportions of Goyet Q2 ancestry and formed a distinct group. Examples of admixed Goyet Q2 and Villabruna ancestry, such as the El Mirón Iberian Hunter-Gatherer, appear in Southern Europe by c. 18.7 kya.

Mitochondrial DNA sequences from the Goyet Q2 cluster belong to basal U and U8a lineages.

==== Ancient Northern East Asians (c. 19 kya) ====
By the end of the LGM (c. 23.4–19 kya), East Asian populations had already diverged into distinct northern and southern lineages. During this period, a major population turnover occurred in northern East Asia, as pre-LGM Tianyuan-related ancestry was largely replaced by the Ancient Northern East Asian lineage (also known as coastal Northern East Asian or Amur ancestry). By the terminal Pleistocene, Ancient Northern East Asian ancestry was predominant across the Amur River Basin region, southern Siberia, the West Liao River, large area of Mongolia, and Northern China.

The earliest known sample of this lineage is AR19K ('NE56'), a c. 19 kya male from the Amur River region. AR19K is genetically closer to later ancient and present-day East Asians than to earlier lineages represented by Tianyuan and AR33K, and more closely related to subsequent northern East Asians, including individuals from the Amur Basin (c. 14–10 kya), Devil's Gate (c. 7.7 kya), Shandong (c. 9.5–7.7 kya), and Lake Baikal (c. 7.1–6.3 kya) than to Southern East Asians such as Qihedong or Liangdao. Later Amur Basin individuals, including the AR14K group and NE-1 (c. 12.7–12.5 kya) can be described as descendants of the same ancestral lineage.

ANEA-related ancestry contributed to the formation of Native Americans and Ancient Paleo-Siberians. It persisted in the Amur River region for over 14,000 years, and is ancestral to several present-day groups including Tungusic and Mongolic speakers.

AR19K carried mtDNA haplogroup G2 and Y-chromosome haplogroup C2. He is the earliest known carrier of the derived EDAR variant, associated with thicker hair shafts, shovel-shaped incisors, and increased number of sweat glands, which is found at high frequencies in modern Native American and East Asian populations. The same variant of the EDAR gene is also found in the later Amur River individuals. AR19K lacks the variant of the OCA2 gene associated with lighter skin that is found in later East Asian groups.

==== Iberian Hunter-Gatherers (c. 19 kya) ====
Iberian Hunter-Gatherers represent a distinct population formed through admixture between Goyet-Q2 and Villabruna related ancestries. This reflects the survival of the Goyet-Q2 lineage in Iberia, with Villabruna related ancestry largely replacing it elsewhere in Europe. The c. 18.7 kya El Mirón individual provides the earliest evidence of this mixture, demonstrating early connections between these Late Pleistocene populations. This mixed ancestry persisted into the Early Neolithic in Iberia, as incoming farmers admixed with local hunter-gatherers.

Iberian Hunter-Gatherers form a cline between the Goyet Q2 and Villabruna clusters. El Miron herself, along with other Iberian individuals including those from Chan (c. 9.1 kya), Moita do Sebastiao (c. 8 kya), and Balma Guilanya (c. 13 kya), show greater affinity to the Goyet Q2 cluster, while Mesolithic individuals from Northern Iberia in the Cantabrian region, such as Canes 1 (c. 7 kya) and La Braña 1 (c. 7.8 kya), are closer to the Villabruna cluster, indicating additional Villabruna gene flow into northern and northeastern Iberia.

Fournol ancestry remained comparatively high (c. 21–51%) among Iberian Hunter-Gatherers after c. 14 kya. The El Mirón individual can be modelled as c. 57% Fournol ancestry, with a higher (43%) Villabruna-related component than other Magdalenian-associated Goyet Q2 cluster individuals.

Before the Last Glacial Maximum, Y-chromosome haplogroup C was found at high frequencies in the Fournol cluster, and was also common in the Věstonice cluster. After the LGM, haplogroup I became dominant in the GoyetQ2, Villabruna, and Oberkassel clusters. In Iberian Hunter-Gatherers, however, haplogroup C persisted, indicating at least some degree of paternal continuity across the LGM in Iberia.

==== Villabruna Cluster (c. 17–7 kya) ====
By c. 17 kya, southern European Hunter-Gatherers associated with the Epigravettian culture carried a distinctive genetic profile known as 'Villabruna ancestry', which shows closer affinity to ancient and present-day Near Eastern populations than earlier Europeans. Named after a c. 14 kya partial male skeleton ('Villabruna 1') from Riparo Villabruna, Italy, this cluster, sometimes grouped with the Oberkassel cluster as 'Western Hunter-Gatherers', includes Arene Candide 16 (c. 12.8 kya, Liguria), San Teodoro (c. 12.6 kya, San Teodoro cave), and other individuals from Italy. Following the Last Glacial Maximum, Villabruna ancestry expanded (likely from the Balkans) into the Italian peninsula, and across Western and central Europe, largely replacing Magdalenian-associated Goyet Q2 lineages.

Posth et al. (2023) model Villabruna as c. 54% Bacho Kiro UP (BK1653)-related, with a 46% contribution from a lineage basal to the Kostenki 14/Goyet Q116-1 split. Posth et al. propose that the BK1653-related component in Villabruna also contributed 59% to the Věstonice cluster, suggesting a shared ancestry between Villabruna and Věstonice may have been present in the Balkans before 30 kya. The later Oberkassel cluster derives the majority (c. 75–90%) of its ancestry from Villabruna (represented by Arene Candide 16), with a minor (10–25%) contribution from a population represented by either Fournol 85 or Goyet Q2.

The Villabruna cluster shows elevated frequencies of Y-DNA haplogroup I compared with Věstonice cluster individuals, although the Villabruna 1 individual himself carried Y-DNA haplogroup R1b1. The cluster's mtDNA lineages are dominated by haplogroup U5. The combination of blue eyes, dark skin and curly dark brown to nearly black hair was probably very common among Villabruna cluster individuals. Posth et al. (2023) suggest that the HERC2 gene variant associated with the blue or green eye color phenotype found in present-day north Europeans first emerged in Villabruna-related Epigravettian populations, where it occurred at c. 93% frequency, and was later inherited by Oberkassel and Baltic and Scandinavian Hunter-Gatherers.

==== Ancient Paleo-Siberians (c. 17–14 kya) ====
Ancient Paleo-Siberians (APS) are represented by UKY, a male from the Ust-Kyakhta-3 site near Lake Baikal in southern Siberia, dated to c. 14 kya. UKY is closely related to the c. 10 kya Kolyma individual from the Duvanny Yar site in northeastern Siberia. Khaiyrgas-1, a juvenile female from Khaiyrgas cave in southwestern Yakutia (Dyuktai culture, c. 16.9 kya) has been described as an early representative of the APS lineage. Ancient Paleo-Siberians, like Native Americans, descend from the admixed Ancient North Eurasian and East Asian populations that formed around the time of the Last Glacial Maximum and were likely widespread in Siberia during the Upper Paleolithic. Mao et al. (2021) suggest that an AR14K-related population could be the direct source for the East Asian component in APS.

Mao et al. (2021) describe APS as deriving around 68% of their ancestry from a mixed Afontova Gora 3 (42%) and Devil's Gate (58%) related source, with the remaining 32% supplied by an additional Devil's Gate-related source. Alternatively, Yu et al. (2020) model APS as deriving around 73% of their ancestry from a mixed Onge (70%) and Ancient North Eurasian (30%) related source, with the remainder (27%) from a population ancestral to Devil's Gate.

Altai Hunter-Gatherers, a later Siberian population who formed c. 11–7.4 kya, show genetic affinity to APS, and can be modelled as c. 53.7%-66.3% UKY, with the remainder from West Siberian Neolithic populations. APS-related ancestry also contributed to West Baikal Late Neolithic and Bronze Age populations, and later individuals from Yakutia (6 kya) and Krasnoyarsk (4.5 kya). Likewise, APS-related ancestry is detected in several ancient Chinese populations, including those from the Yellow River and West Liao River basins.

Ancient Paleo-Siberians are the closest relatives to Native Americans outside of the Americas, and the earliest Native Americans carried APS-like ancestry. Khaiyrgas-1 shows genetic affinity to present-day Selkups, Uralic speaking peoples of northern Siberia.

UKY lacked the derived allele for skin lightening, and was one of the earliest individuals carrying the EDAR-V370A allele.

==== Anatolian Hunter-Gatherers (c. 15 kya) ====
Anatolian Hunter-Gatherer (AHG) ancestry is represented by 'ZBC', a male individual from Pınarbaşı, Turkey, dated to c. 15.4 kya. AHG ancestry can be described as forming from roughly equal contributions of a Natufian-like group and a Late Upper Paleolithic West Eurasian Villabruna-related population, likely shortly after the Last Glacial Maximum (c. 19 kya).

The AHG lineage was the main source of ancestry for early Anatolian farmers. In central Anatolia, Anatolian Aceramic Farmers (AAF) at Boncuklu (c. 10 kya) derived c. 90% of their ancestry from local AHG populations, with the remaining c. 10% from Neolithic Iran/Caucasus-related groups. The subsequent Anatolian Ceramic Farmers (ACF) retained c. 80% AHG-related ancestry, with c. 20% from Iran Neolithic/Caucasus.

Genetic continuity from Anatolian Hunter-Gatherers to early Anatolian Farmers suggests that Anatolian Hunter-Gatherers independently adopted farming without substantial admixture with other populations. The spread of farming into Europe was driven by migrations of Neolithic Anatolian populations, who later admixed with local European hunter-gatherers.

==== Iberomaurusians (c. 15 kya) ====
Iberomaurusian ancestry (also called Maghrebi or Taforalt ancestry) is represented by individuals associated with the Iberomaurusian culture, including those from Taforalt in eastern Morocco (c. 15.1–13.9 kya) and Afalou Bou Rhummel (ABR) in Algeria (older than c. 10 kya).

Taforalt individuals can be described as deriving roughly 60–64% of their ancestry from Natufian-related populations, with the remainder from sub-Saharan African sources or early Holocene North African groups such as the c. 7 kya individuals from the Takarkori rock shelter in southwestern Libya. Taforalt genomes show elevated Basal Eurasian ancestry and reduced Neanderthal admixture relative to most other Upper Paleolithic populations. No evidence of Paleolithic European gene flow was found in the Taforalt genomes. The Taforalt individuals were closely genetically related, indicative of a population bottleneck.

Uniparental markers include Y-chromosome haplogroup E1b1b1a1, common in present-day North and East Africa, and mitochondrial haplogroups U6a and M1b which were possibly introduced via a 'back-to-Africa' migration from West Asia.

Iberomaurusian-associated individuals show substantial genetic affinity to Epipaleolithic Natufians and other early Holocene Near Eastern populations, indicating early connections between North Africa and the Levant before the Neolithic.

In principal component analysis, Iberomaurusians occupy an intermediate position between present-day North Africans and East Africans. The Iberomaurusian genetic component is found in modern North African populations, particularly among Amazigh (Berber) groups, on a west-to-east cline, suggesting long-term regional continuity since the Epipalaeolithic.

==== Oberkassel Cluster (c. 14 kya) ====
The Oberkassel cluster, named after two c. 14 kya individuals from Oberkassel, Germany is one of the two main hunter gatherer genetic profiles found in Europe from c. 14 kya, alongside the Sidelkino cluster further east. Oberkassel ancestry was widespread across western and central Europe, and its expansion may be related to ecological changes during the Bølling–Allerød warming (c. 14.8–12.9 kya). Unlike Iberian Hunter-Gatherers, who acquired Villabruna/Oberkassel ancestry through multiple local admixture events with groups carrying high levels of GoyetQ2 ancestry, western and central European groups after c. 14 kya display a relatively homogeneous Oberkassel ancestry. This indicates that this genetic profile was already established prior to its expansion from southern to central Europe. The Oberkassel cluster forms one of the three main genetic components of present-day Europeans.

The Oberkassel cluster derives the majority of its ancestry from the Villabruna lineage, with a lesser contribution from a population related to Goyet Q2 or Fournol. Oberkassel cluster individuals can be consistently modelled as a mixture of either 75% Villabruna and 25% GoyetQ2, or 90% Villabruna and 10% Fournol.

The Oberkassel cluster is genetically distinct from hunter-gatherers further to the east (Eastern Hunter-Gatherers, also known as the Sidelkino cluster), who can be described as an admixed population of mainly Ancient North Eurasian ancestry with a contribution from a Villabruna or Oberkassel related source. Between c. 14–8 kya, hunter gatherers in western and central Europe can be modelled entirely with Oberkassel ancestry, while populations in the Baltics, Scandinavia, the Balkans, and Ukraine already exhibit mixed Oberkassel/Sidelkino ancestry prior to c. 8 kya. Oberkassel individuals typically carried mtDNA haplogroup U5 and Y-DNA haplogroup I, in contrast to Sidelkino individuals who carried higher frequencies of mtDNA haplogroups U2, U4, and R1b, and Y-chromosome haplogroups Q, R, and J. Oberkassel individuals likely had darker skin and lighter eyes than Sidelkino individuals.

==== Eastern Hunter-Gatherers (c. 14 kya) ====
Eastern Hunter-Gatherers (EHG), also called the Sidelkino cluster, formed around c. 14 kya, with the earliest direct evidence in eastern Europe c. 13 kya. This ancestry can be described as a mixture of Ancient North Eurasian and Villabruna/Oberkassel-related components. Pre-8 kya Sidelkino individuals generally derive c. 70% ancestry from Ancient North Eurasians and c. 30–38% from Villabruna/Oberkassel-related sources.

The earliest representative of this ancestry is PES001, a male from Peschanitsa, Arkhangelsk, Russia, dated to c. 12.6 kya. PES001 shows closest affinity to individuals from European Russia, West Siberian Neolithic groups, and Afontova Gora 3. He is assigned to the Sidelkino cluster, but displays extra affinity to the Oberkassel cluster (Villabruna-related) relative to other EHGs, suggesting variable levels of Oberkassel or Villabruna ancestry in EHG individuals at the time of the cluster's formation.

Attempts to model PES001 as a mix of either Oberkassel or Villabruna, with the remainder supplied by either ANE or CHG did not produce a good fit, suggesting that neither Oberkassel nor Villabruna were the actual source of WHG ancestry in this individual.

PES001 carried mtDNA haplogroup U4a1, found in other EHGs and Scandinavian Hunter-Gatherers, and Y-DNA R1a-YP1272, previously found in other EHG males.

==== Natufian Hunter-Gatherers (c. 14–11 kya) ====
Natufian Hunter-Gatherers, also called 'Levantine Hunter-Gatherers', were an Epipalaeolithic population of the Levant, whose range may have extended into the Arabian Peninsula. They represent a distinct West Asian lineage that can be modelled as a mixture of Basal Eurasian and West Eurasian (Kostenki14-related) ancestries, with a possible minor contribution from Ancestral North Africans. Natufians carry substantial levels of Basal Eurasian ancestry, with estimates ranging from c. 15% up to c. 66%.

Natufians contributed ancestry to both ancient and present-day Middle Eastern populations, and represent one of the three sources of ancestry for West Asian Neolithic populations (along with CHG/Iran and Anatolian Hunter-Gatherers). Neolithic Levantine farmers can be modelled as c. 60.5% Natufian-related and 39.5% Anatolian Neolithic-related. North African Taforalt individuals also show substantial Natufian ancestry (60%), with the remainder from sub-Saharan or Takarkori-like Ancestral North African sources.

In modern populations, Natufians show more affinity to present-day Arabians than to present-day Levantines, though this may reflect later Neolithic Farmer gene flow into Arabian populations. Natufian ancestry is estimated at c. 57% in present-day Bedouin groups, and at c. 45% in Lebanese Muslims.

Natufian uniparental markers include mtDNA haplogroups H5, J2, and N1, and Y-DNA haplogroups CT and E1. Haplogroup E1b1b is common in Natufians.

==== MZR Red Deer Cave (c. 14 kya) ====
MZR (Mengzi Ren) is a female individual from Malu Dong (Red Deer Cave), Yunnan Province, southwest China dated to c. 14.0 kya. Her nuclear DNA is close to southern East Asians, implying the genetic divergence of Northern and Southern East Asian populations by the late Pleistocene.

She carries an extinct basal lineage of mtDNA haplogroup M9. Her estimated archaic human ancestry is c. 1.29% Denisovan, and c. 1.27% Neanderthal, similar to present day East Asians.

==== Caucasus Hunter-Gatherers (c. 13.3 kya) ====
Caucasus Hunter-Gatherers (CHG), also known as the Satsurblia Cluster, are a distinct Upper Paleolithic and Early Holocene population from the Caucasus, represented by a c. 13.3 kya male from Satsurblia Cave, Northwest Georgia ('SATP'), and a later Holocene individual from the Kotias Klde site. CHGs are genetically similar to Neolithic individuals from Iran, and they are often grouped under labels such as Iran_N/CHG, Iran/Caucasus ancestry, or Zagros/Caucasus ancestry.

Jones et al. (2015) suggest that West Asians split from North European hunter-gatherers c. 45 kya, subsequently splitting into CHGs and the ancestors of Anatolian farmers c. 24 kya, near the beginning of the Last Glacial Maximum. Alternatively, Marchi et al. (2022) propose that CHGs diverged from a 'Central' metapopulation ancestral to CHG and early western farmers at the beginning of the Bølling–Allerød Interstadial, around 14.2 kya, shortly after receiving gene flow from a 'Western' metapopulation. Vallini et al. (2024) propose that the population ancestral to CHG expanded from the Iranian plateau to the Caucasus between 25 and 13 kya. By the early Holocene, CHG/Iranian ancestry was widespread across areas south of the Caucasus, from the Caspian Sea to central Anatolia and into Upper Mesopotamia.

CHG can be described as a mixture of c. 68% Ancient North Eurasian and 32% Basal Eurasian ancestry, or alternatively as c. 72% Western Asia Upper Paleolithic (itself a mixture of 52% Yana-related and 48% Basal Eurasian), 18% Caucasus Upper Paleolithic, and 10% MA1-related (ANE) ancestry. CHG ancestry contributed significantly to the Yamnaya steppe herders who expanded into Europe c. 3000 BCE, and is also detected in Late Neolithic Aegeans, Chalcolithic Anatolians, Early–Middle Bronze Age Minoans, and Mycenaeans. Among modern populations, CHG-Iranian ancestry is highest in Iran, Afghanistan, Pakistan, and India.

The Satsurblia individual carried Y-DNA haplogroup J2 and an early example of mtDNA haplogroup K3. Long runs of homozygosity suggest recent consanguinity and low effective population size in the ancestral population, perhaps a result of genetic bottlenecks during the LGM. Like other CHGs, he likely had dark hair and brown eyes, but may have had lighter skin than Western Hunter-Gatherers as he carried the derived SLC24A5 allele.

==== Southern Native Americans (c. 12.8 kya) ====
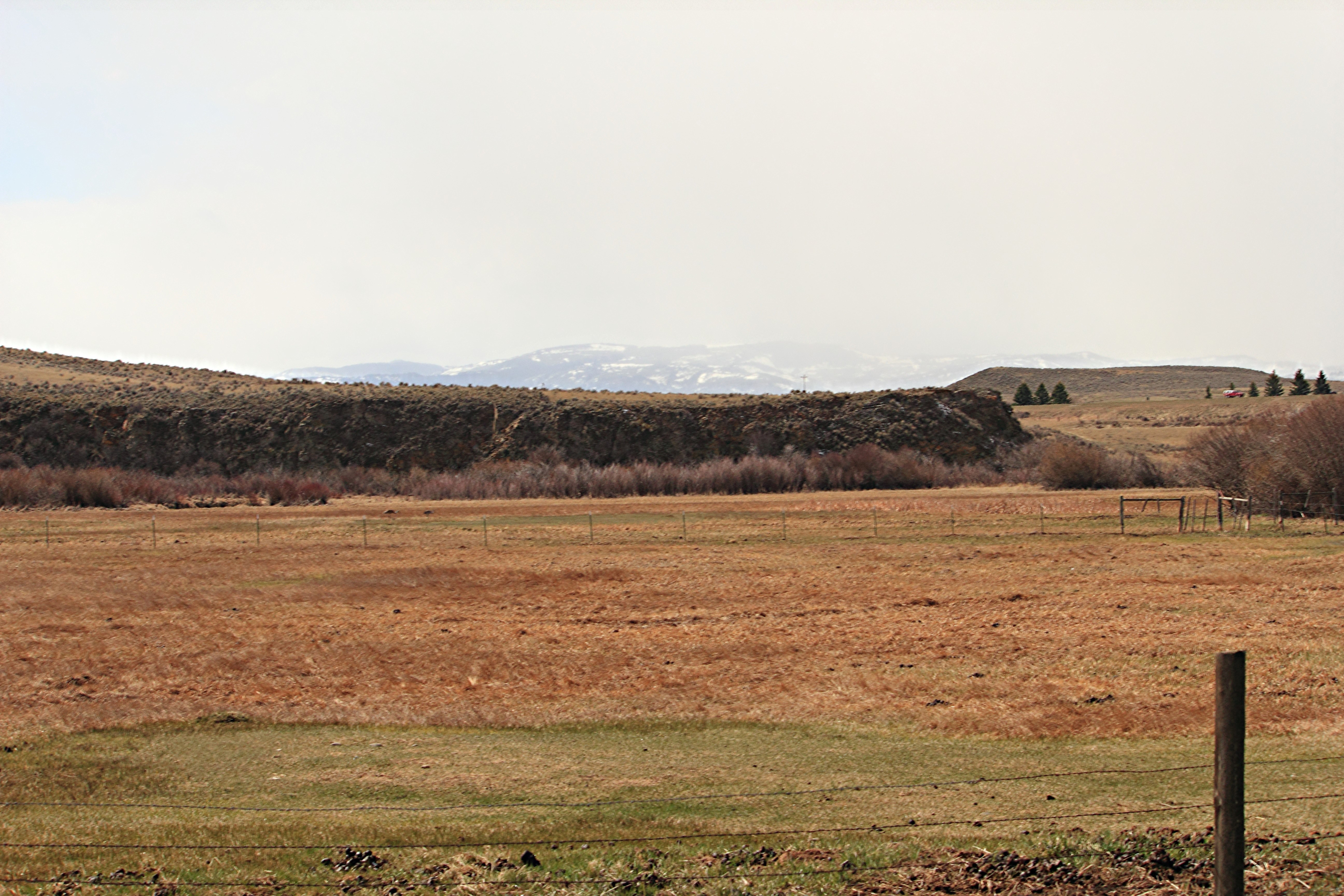
Anzick site, Montana, USA

Southern Native Americans (SNA), also known as Ancestral-A (ANC-A), are represented by Anzick-1, a male infant associated with Clovis artefacts from the Anzick site in western Montana, USA, dated to c. 12.8 kya. Anzick-1 was the first ancient American genome to be sequenced and published. He represents a population that inhabited North America from the Late Pleistocene to the Early Holocene, and falls within the range of present-day Native American genetic diversity.

Anzick-1 is more closely related to present-day Native American populations of Central and South America than to those of North America. His lineage is estimated to have diverged from the Spirit Cave and Lagoa Santa individuals around 14 kya. Despite different archaeological contexts, the Anzick-1 (Clovis) and Spirit Cave (Western Stemmed Tradition) genomes are closely related.

Anzick-1 can be described as descending from a population of c. 68% ancient East Asian and c. 32% Ancient North Eurasian ancestry. He shares ancestry with the earliest known South Americans from Lapa do Santo (Brazil) and Los Rieles (Chile), and weak evidence of Anzick-related ancestry is found in the oldest Central American from Belize. This suggests that Anzick-1 related groups spread to Central and South America, possibly associated with the expansion of the Fishtail Complex. However, the Anzick-1 population itself made only a small contribution to the ancestry of later South and Central Americans, and after c. 5 kya, a second Southern Native American lineage largely replaced earlier Anzick-1 related SNA groups in South America.

Anzick1 belonged to Y-DNA haplogroup Q-CTS1780 and mtDNA haplogroup D4h3a. These lineages were commonly found in ancient American groups, but are rare among present-day native populations.

==== Iranian Hunter-Gatherers (c. 12 kya) ====
Iranian Hunter-Gatherers are represented by a 6–8 year old individual ('I2312') from Belt Cave in the Alborz Mountains, Iran, dated c. 12 kya. This individual has similar ancestry to early Iranian Neolithic farmers from the Zagros Mountains, and also shows close genetic affinity to Caucasus Hunter-Gatherers.

It has been suggested that West Asian populations separated from Northern Europeans c. 45 kya and remained in the Levant and South Caucasus, with the population ancestral to both Iranian and Caucasus Hunter-Gatherers subsequently emerging from this West Asian population after c. 24 kya. In this scenario, CHG derive the majority of their ancestry (c. 72%) from a West Asia UP or Iran Neolithic-like population, with additional gene flow from various hunter-gatherer groups. Alternatively Marchi et al. (2022) propose that the ancestors of Iranian Neolithic farmers diverged from an 'Eastern' metapopulation c. 13.6 kya, following an earlier split from a 'Central' metapopulation c. 15.8 kya. Marchi et al. (2022) suggest that despite the close genetic affinity between Caucasus HGs and early Iranian farmers, CHGs instead share a common ancestor with early Western farmers, and received admixture from the 'Western' metapopulation, while the ancestors of the Iranian Neolithic population instead diverged from the 'Eastern' metapopulation c. 13.6 kya after its split from the Central metapopulation, without Western gene flow.

==== Ancient Guangxi (c. 12 kya) ====
Ancient Guangxi (also known as 'Longlin') ancestry, an early-branching East Asian lineage, is represented by a human skull excavated from Laomocao Cave, Guangxi, southern China, dated to c. 11.8–11.3 kya. Like the Jōmon ancestry found in Ikawazu, Japan, Longlin split from other East Asian lineages before the Northern ('Shandong') and Southern ('Fujian') East Asian lineages diversified from each other. Ancient Guangxi ancestry is genetically closer to Shandong and Fujian than to more deeply diverging Asian ancestries like Tianyuan, Papuans, Andamanese, or Hòabinhian.

Ancient Guangxi ancestry is found in admixed form until at least the Early Neolithic. Later populations of Guangxi (9–6 kya) are a mix of local Guangxi ancestry, ancient Southern East Asian (Fujian-related) ancestry, and Southeast Asian Hunter-Gatherer (Hòabìnhian) ancestry. Individuals carrying this genetic profile include the c. 9 kya individual from Dushan Cave, around 400 km from Longlin, and the c. 8.3–6.4 kya individuals from Baojianshan Cave, near the Vietnamese border.

Ancient Guangxi ancestry appears to have no modern descendants, as outgroup-f₃ statistics show that the Longlin individual is not closely related to modern East Asians.

==== Ancient Southern East Asian (c. 12 kya) ====
The Ancient Southern East Asian lineage (also known as 'coastal Southern East Asian' or 'Fujian ancestry') diverged from Northern East Asians by c. 19 kya. Ancient Southern East Asian ancestry is found in the Fujian region between c. 12–4 kya. The oldest known representative is Qihe3, a c. 11.7–11.4 kya (Epipaleolithic) male from Qihe Cave, Fujian province, China. Qihe3 clusters with the later Qihe2 individual from the same site, as well as the c. 8 kya individuals Liangdao1 and Liangdao2.

Ancient Southern East Asian ancestry is genetically similar to Neolithic Southeast Asians and Austronesian related groups from the Southwest Pacific. ASEAs show the strongest connection to modern Austronesian speakers, compatible with the hypothesis of Proto Austronesian origins on the south coast of China. After the Neolithic, Ancient Northern East Asian ancestry spread southwards, with later Ancient Southern East Asian populations such as Tanshishan showing increased affinity to Northern East Asians.

==== Balkan Hunter-Gatherers (c. 12 kya) ====
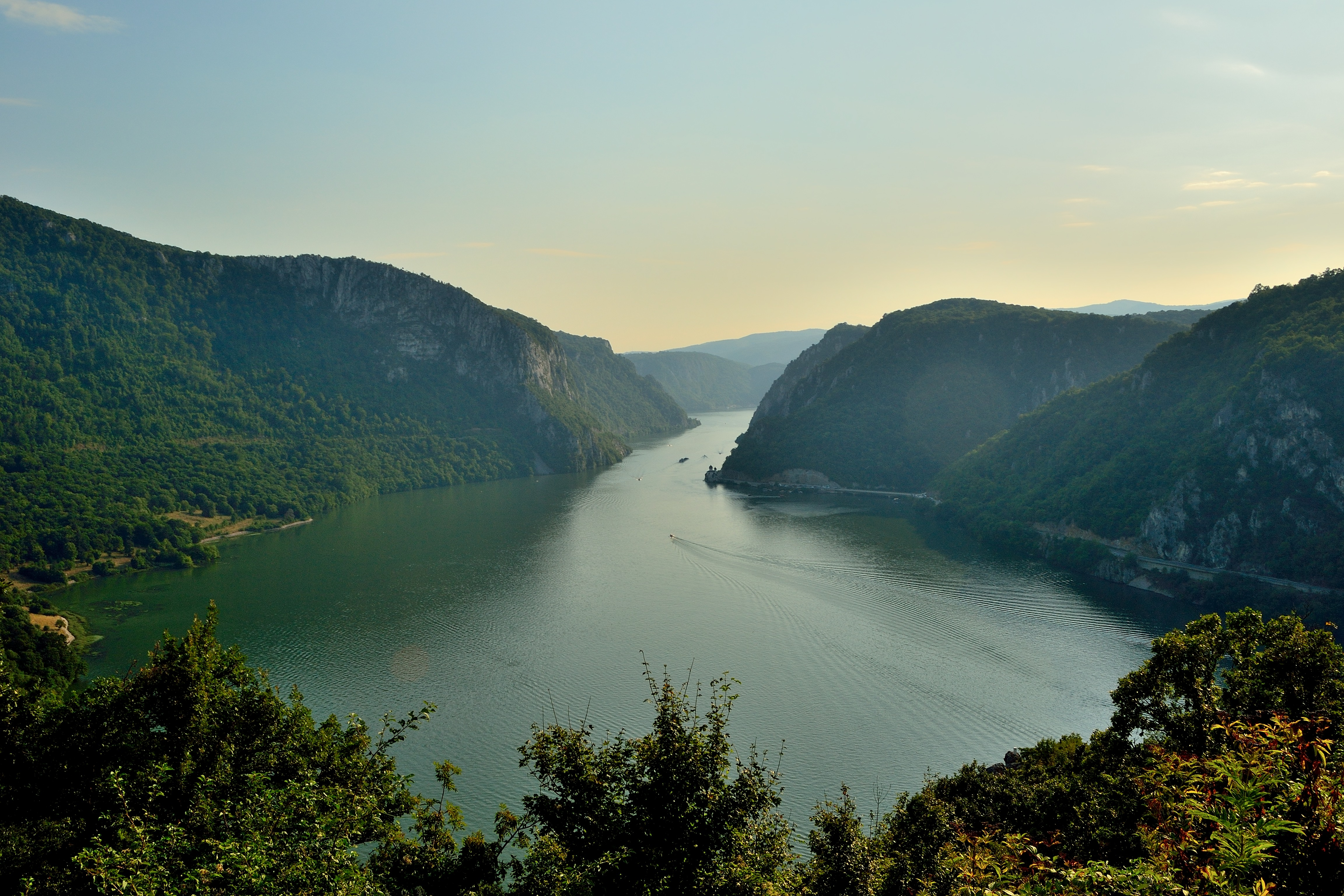
Iron Gates, Danube

Balkan Hunter-Gatherers, also known as Iron Gates Hunter-Gatherers, inhabited the Danube Iron Gates region of present-day Serbia and Romania. They are represented by I4657, a female from Vlasac, Serbia, dated to c. 11.7–11.2 kya. The Balkan Hunter-Gatherer cluster likely formed between c. 12–10.4 kya, and carried a mixture of Oberkassel ('WHG') and Sidelkino ('EHG') ancestry, without significant Anatolian Hunter-Gatherer ancestry. Mathieson et al. (2018) model Balkan Hunter-Gatherers as c. 85% WHG and c. 15% EHG.

Balkan Hunter-Gatherers carry mtDNA haplogroup K1, along with subclades of haplogroups U and H, unlike WHGs, EHGs, and Scandinavian Hunter-Gatherers, who generally carry haplogroups U5 or U2. The derived allele of the HERC2 gene linked to green or blue eyes was present in Balkan Hunter-Gatherers at low frequency (c. 10–25%).

==== Ancient Beringians (c. 11.5 kya) ====
Ancient Beringians are represented by two infants from a double burial at the Upward Sun River site in the Tanana River Valley, Alaska, USA, both dated to the terminal Pleistocene (c. 11.5 kya): USR1 (a 6–12 week old female), and USR2, a prenatal female. A later Ancient Beringian, a young child from Trail Creek Cave (c. 9 kya, Seward Peninsula, Alaska) is closely related to USR1.

The Ancient Beringian lineage is basal to all known present-day and ancient Native American populations. Although more closely related to Native Americans than to any other population, Ancient Beringians are not the direct ancestors of Native American populations. Their ancestors diverged from East Asians c. 36 kya, subsequently receiving additional gene flow from East Asians and Ancient North Eurasians. The Ancient Beringian lineage then split from the ancestors of all other known Native American populations between 22–18 kya in Beringia, before then migrating east into Alaska. There is no genetic evidence that Ancient Beringians moved further south or mixed with other Native American groups, and the lineage eventually disappeared at some point after 9 kya.

USR1 can be described as descending from a population that derives c. 58–60% of her ancestry from an East Asian-related population and 40–42% from an Ancient North Eurasian-related source. She carried the derived variant of the FADS2 gene, linked to fatty acid metabolism, which is widespread among modern Native Americans. Unlike the vast majority of Native Americans and East Asians, USR1 lacked the derived variant of the EDAR gene that affects tooth shape, hair morphology, sweat glands, and mammary gland development.

== Sources ==
- Allentoft, Morten E.; Sikora, Martin; Refoyo-Martínez, Alba; Irving-Pease, Evan K.; Fischer, Anders; Barrie, William; Ingason, Andrés; Stenderup, Jesper; Sjögren, Karl-Göran; Pearson, Alice; Sousa da Mota, Bárbara; Schulz Paulsson, Bettina; Halgren, Alma; Macleod, Ruairidh; Jørkov, Marie Louise Schjellerup (2024). "Population genomics of post-glacial western Eurasia". Nature. 625 (7994): 301–311. Bibcode:2024Natur.625..301A. doi:10.1038/s41586-023-06865-0. ISSN 1476-4687. PMC 10781627. PMID 38200295.
- Almarri, Mohamed A.; Haber, Marc; Lootah, Reem A.; Hallast, Pille; Al Turki, Saeed; Martin, Hilary C.; Xue, Yali; Tyler-Smith, Chris (2021). "The genomic history of the Middle East". Cell. 184 (18): 4612–4625.e14. doi:10.1016/j.cell.2021.07.013. PMC 8445022. PMID 34352227.
- Andreeva, Tatiana V.; Manakhov, Andrey D.; Gusev, Fedor E.; Patrikeev, Anton D.; Golovanova, Lyubov V.; Doronichev, Vladimir B.; Shirobokov, Ivan G.; Rogaev, Evgeny I. (29 July 2022). "Genomic analysis of a novel Neanderthal from Mezmaiskaya Cave provides insights into the genetic relationships of Middle Palaeolithic populations". Scientific Reports. 12 (1) 13016. Bibcode:2022NatSR..1213016A. doi:10.1038/s41598-022-16164-9. ISSN 2045-2322. PMC 9338269. PMID 35906446.
- Aoki, Kenichi; Takahata, Naoyuki; Oota, Hiroki; Wakano, Joe Yuichiro; Feldman, Marcus W. (30 August 2023). "Infectious diseases may have arrested the southward advance of microblades in Upper Palaeolithic East Asia". Proceedings of the Royal Society B: Biological Sciences. 290 (2005) 20231262. doi:10.1098/rspb.2023.1262. PMC 10465978. PMID 37644833.
- Badalyan, Ruben (2022). Badalyan, Ruben (ed.). The Neolithic Settlement of Aknashen (Ararat valley, Armenia): Excavation seasons 2004-2015. Erscheinungsort nicht ermittelbar: Archaeopress Publishing Archaeopress Publishing Ltd [Imprint]. ISBN 978-1-80327-003-6.
- Bennett, E. Andrew; Parasayan, Oğuzhan; Prat, Sandrine; Péan, Stéphane; Crépin, Laurent; Yanevich, Alexandr; Grange, Thierry; Geigl, Eva-Maria (23 October 2023). "Genome sequences of 36,000- to 37,000-year-old modern humans at Buran-Kaya III in Crimea". Nature Ecology & Evolution. 7 (12): 2160–2172. Bibcode:2023NatEE...7.2160B. doi:10.1038/s41559-023-02211-9. ISSN 2397-334X. PMID 37872416.
- Bennett, Andrew E.; Liu, Yichen; Fu, Qiaomei (31 January 2025). Reconstructing the Human Population History of East Asia through Ancient Genomics (1 ed.). Cambridge University Press. doi:10.1017/9781009246675. ISBN 978-1-009-24667-5.
- Bergström, Anders; Stringer, Chris; Hajdinjak, Mateja; Scerri, Eleanor M. L.; Skoglund, Pontus (11 February 2021). "Origins of modern human ancestry". Nature. 590 (7845): 229–237. Bibcode:2021Natur.590..229B. doi:10.1038/s41586-021-03244-5. ISSN 0028-0836. PMID 33568824.
- Bočarnikov, Vladimir Nikolaevič; Steblânskaâ, Alina Nikolaevna (2022). Humans in the Siberian landscapes: ethnocultural dynamics and interaction with nature and space. Springer geography. Cham, Switzerland: Springer. ISBN 978-3-030-90060-1.
- Bokelmann, Lukas; Hajdinjak, Mateja; Peyrégne, Stéphane; Brace, Selina; Essel, Elena; de Filippo, Cesare; Glocke, Isabelle; Grote, Steffi; Mafessoni, Fabrizio; Nagel, Sarah; Kelso, Janet; Prüfer, Kay; Vernot, Benjamin; Barnes, Ian; Pääbo, Svante (30 July 2019). "A genetic analysis of the Gibraltar Neanderthals". Proceedings of the National Academy of Sciences. 116 (31): 15610–15615. Bibcode:2019PNAS..11615610B. doi:10.1073/pnas.1903984116. PMC 6681707. PMID 31308224.
- Bortolini, Eugenio; Pagani, Luca; Oxilia, Gregorio; Posth, Cosimo; Fontana, Federica; Badino, Federica; Saupe, Tina; Montinaro, Francesco; Margaritora, Davide; Romandini, Matteo; Lugli, Federico; Papini, Andrea; Boggioni, Marco; Perrini, Nicola; Oxilia, Antonio (7 June 2021). "Early Alpine occupation backdates westward human migration in Late Glacial Europe". Current Biology. 31 (11): 2484–2493.e7. Bibcode:2021CBio...31E2484B. doi:10.1016/j.cub.2021.03.078. hdl:11577/3389005. ISSN 0960-9822. PMID 33887180.
- Brandt, Guido; Szécsényi-Nagy, Anna; Roth, Christina; Alt, Kurt Werner; Haak, Wolfgang (1 February 2015). "Human paleogenetics of Europe – The known knowns and the known unknowns". Journal of Human Evolution. Special Issue: Ancient DNA and Human Evolution. 79: 73–92. Bibcode:2015JHumE..79...73B. doi:10.1016/j.jhevol.2014.06.017. ISSN 0047-2484. PMID 25467114.
- Brand, Colin M.; Colbran, Laura L.; Capra, John A. (31 August 2022). "Predicting Archaic Hominin Phenotypes from Genomic Data". Annual Review of Genomics and Human Genetics. 23 (1): 591–612. doi:10.1146/annurev-genom-111521-121903. ISSN 1527-8204. PMC 10250142. PMID 35440148.
- Brown, Samantha; Massilani, Diyendo; Kozlikin, Maxim B.; Shunkov, Michael V.; Derevianko, Anatoly P.; Stoessel, Alexander; Jope-Street, Blair; Meyer, Matthias; Kelso, Janet; Pääbo, Svante; Higham, Thomas; Douka, Katerina (2022). "The earliest Denisovans and their cultural adaptation". Nature Ecology & Evolution. 6 (1): 28–35. doi:10.1038/s41559-021-01581-2. ISSN 2397-334X. PMC 7612221. PMID 34824388.
- Cartmill, Matt; Smith, Fred H. (2022). The human lineage (2 ed.). Hoboken, NJ: Wiley-Blackwell. ISBN 978-1-119-08670-3.
- Cassidy, Lara M. (2019). "A steppe in the right direction". Nature Ecology & Evolution. 3 (6): 877–878. Bibcode:2019NatEE...3..877C. doi:10.1038/s41559-019-0876-4. ISSN 2397-334X. PMID 31036895.
- Charlton, Sophy; Brace, Selina; Hajdinjak, Mateja; Kearney, Rebecca; Booth, Thomas; Reade, Hazel; Tripp, Jennifer A.; Sayle, Kerry L.; Grimm, Sonja B.; Bello, Silvia M.; Walker, Elizabeth A.; Gilardet, Alexandre; East, Philip; Glocke, Isabelle; Larson, Greger (2022). "Dual ancestries and ecologies of the Late Glacial Palaeolithic in Britain". Nature Ecology & Evolution. 6 (11): 1658–1668. Bibcode:2022NatEE...6.1658C. doi:10.1038/s41559-022-01883-z. ISSN 2397-334X. PMC 9630104. PMID 36280785.
- Chataigner, Christine (2024). "The South Caucasus from the Upper Palaeolithic to the Neolithic: Intersection of the genetic and archaeological data". Quaternary Science Reviews. 345, 109061 109061. Bibcode:2024QSRv..34509061C. doi:10.1016/j.quascirev.2024.109061. ISSN 0277-3791.
- Chintalapati, Manjusha; Patterson, Nick; Moorjani, Priya (30 May 2022). "The spatiotemporal patterns of major human admixture events during the European Holocene". eLife. 11 e77625. doi:10.7554/eLife.77625. ISSN 2050-084X. PMC 9293011. PMID 35635751.
- Clemente, Florian; Unterländer, Martina; Dolgova, Olga; Amorim, Carlos Eduardo G.; Coroado-Santos, Francisco; Neuenschwander, Samuel; Ganiatsou, Elissavet; Dávalos, Diana I. Cruz; Anchieri, Lucas; Michaud, Frédéric; Winkelbach, Laura; Blöcher, Jens; Cárdenas, Yami Ommar Arizmendi; Mota, Bárbara Sousa da; Kalliga, Eleni (13 May 2021). "The genomic history of the Aegean palatial civilizations". Cell. 184 (10): 2565–2586.e21. doi:10.1016/j.cell.2021.03.039. ISSN 0092-8674. PMC 8127963. PMID 33930288.
- Colbran, Laura L.; Gamazon, Eric R.; Zhou, Dan; Evans, Patrick; Cox, Nancy J.; Capra, John A. (2019). "Inferred divergent gene regulation in archaic hominins reveals potential phenotypic differences". Nature Ecology & Evolution. 3 (11): 1598–1606. Bibcode:2019NatEE...3.1598C. doi:10.1038/s41559-019-0996-x. ISSN 2397-334X. PMC 7046098. PMID 31591491.
- Condemi, Silvana; Weniger, Gerd-Christian (2011). Continuity and discontinuity in the peopling of Europe: one hundred fifty years of Neanderthal study proceedings in the international congress to commemorate "150 years of Neanderthal discovery, 1856-2006". Vertebrate paleobiology and paleoanthropology. New York: Springer. ISBN 978-94-007-0491-6.
- Devièse, Thibaut; Abrams, Grégory; Hajdinjak, Mateja; Pirson, Stéphane; De Groote, Isabelle; Di Modica, Kévin; Toussaint, Michel; Fischer, Valentin; Comeskey, Dan; Spindler, Luke; Meyer, Matthias; Semal, Patrick; Higham, Tom (23 March 2021). "Reevaluating the timing of Neanderthal disappearance in Northwest Europe". Proceedings of the National Academy of Sciences. 118 (12) e2022466118. Bibcode:2021PNAS..11822466D. doi:10.1073/pnas.2022466118. PMC 7999949. PMID 33798098.
- Douka, Katerina; Slon, Viviane; Jacobs, Zenobia; Ramsey, Christopher Bronk; Shunkov, Michael V.; Derevianko, Anatoly P.; Mafessoni, Fabrizio; Kozlikin, Maxim B.; Li, Bo; Grün, Rainer; Comeskey, Daniel; Devièse, Thibaut; Brown, Samantha; Viola, Bence; Kinsley, Leslie (2019). "Age estimates for hominin fossils and the onset of the Upper Palaeolithic at Denisova Cave". Nature. 565 (7741): 640–644. Bibcode:2019Natur.565..640D. doi:10.1038/s41586-018-0870-z. ISSN 1476-4687. PMID 30700871.
- Essel, Elena; Zavala, Elena I.; Schulz-Kornas, Ellen; Kozlikin, Maxim B.; Fewlass, Helen; Vernot, Benjamin; Shunkov, Michael V.; Derevianko, Anatoly P.; Douka, Katerina; Barnes, Ian; Soulier, Marie-Cécile; Schmidt, Anna; Szymanski, Merlin; Tsanova, Tsenka; Sirakov, Nikolay (2023). "Ancient human DNA recovered from a Palaeolithic pendant". Nature. 618 (7964): 328–332. Bibcode:2023Natur.618..328E. doi:10.1038/s41586-023-06035-2. ISSN 1476-4687. PMC 10247382. PMID 37138083.
- Fan, Shaohua; Kelly, Derek E.; Beltrame, Marcia H.; Hansen, Matthew E. B.; Mallick, Swapan; Ranciaro, Alessia; Hirbo, Jibril; Thompson, Simon; Beggs, William; Nyambo, Thomas; Omar, Sabah A.; Meskel, Dawit Wolde; Belay, Gurja; Froment, Alain; Patterson, Nick (26 April 2019). "African evolutionary history inferred from whole genome sequence data of 44 indigenous African populations". Genome Biology. 20 (1): 82. doi:10.1186/s13059-019-1679-2. ISSN 1474-760X. PMC 6485071. PMID 31023338.
- Feldman, Michal; Fernández-Domínguez, Eva; Reynolds, Luke; Baird, Douglas; Pearson, Jessica; Hershkovitz, Israel; May, Hila; Goring-Morris, Nigel; Benz, Marion; Gresky, Julia; Bianco, Raffaela A.; Fairbairn, Andrew; Mustafaoğlu, Gökhan; Stockhammer, Philipp W.; Posth, Cosimo (19 March 2019). "Late Pleistocene human genome suggests a local origin for the first farmers of central Anatolia". Nature Communications. 10 (1) 1218. Bibcode:2019NatCo..10.1218F. doi:10.1038/s41467-019-09209-7. ISSN 2041-1723. PMC 6425003. PMID 30890703.
- Ferreira, Joana C; Alshamali, Farida; Montinaro, Francesco; Cavadas, Bruno; Torroni, Antonio; Pereira, Luisa; Raveane, Alessandro; Fernandes, Veronica (1 September 2021). Huerta-Sanchez, Emilia (ed.). "Projecting Ancient Ancestry in Modern-Day Arabians and Iranians: A Key Role of the Past Exposed Arabo-Persian Gulf on Human Migrations". Genome Biology and Evolution. 13 (9) evab194. doi:10.1093/gbe/evab194. ISSN 1759-6653. PMC 8435661. PMID 34480555.
- Fewlass, Helen; Zavala, Elena I.; Fagault, Yoann; Tuna, Thibaut; Bard, Edouard; Hublin, Jean-Jacques; Hajdinjak, Mateja; Wilczyński, Jarosław (15 December 2023). "Chronological and genetic analysis of an Upper Palaeolithic female infant burial from Borsuka Cave, Poland". iScience. 26 (12, 108283) 108283. Bibcode:2023iSci...26j8283F. doi:10.1016/j.isci.2023.108283. PMC 10690573. PMID 38047066.
- Fiedel, Stuart J (2022). "Initial Human Colonization of the Americas, Redux". Radiocarbon. 64 (4): 845–897. Bibcode:2022Radcb..64..845F. doi:10.1017/RDC.2021.103. ISSN 0033-8222.
- Fortes-Lima, Cesar (2022). Mtetwa, Ezekia; Schlebusch, Carina (eds.). Africa, the Cradle of Human Diversity: Cultural and Biological Approaches to Uncover African Diversity. Africa-Europe Group for Interdisciplinary Studies. Erscheinungsort nicht ermittelbar: Brill. ISBN 978-90-04-50022-8.
- Fu, Qiaomei; Meyer, Matthias; Gao, Xing; Stenzel, Udo; Burbano, Hernán A.; Kelso, Janet; Pääbo, Svante (5 February 2013). "DNA analysis of an early modern human from Tianyuan Cave, China". Proceedings of the National Academy of Sciences. 110 (6): 2223–2227. Bibcode:2013PNAS..110.2223F. doi:10.1073/pnas.1221359110. ISSN 0027-8424. PMC 3568306. PMID 23341637.
- Fu, Qiaomei; Li, Heng; Moorjani, Priya; Jay, Flora; Slepchenko, Sergey M.; Bondarev, Aleksei A.; Johnson, Philip L. F.; Aximu-Petri, Ayinuer; Prüfer, Kay; de Filippo, Cesare; Meyer, Matthias; Zwyns, Nicolas; Salazar-García, Domingo C.; Kuzmin, Yaroslav V.; Keates, Susan G. (2014). "Genome sequence of a 45,000-year-old modern human from western Siberia". Nature. 514 (7523): 445–449. Bibcode:2014Natur.514..445F. doi:10.1038/nature13810. hdl:10550/42071. ISSN 0028-0836. PMC 4753769. PMID 25341783.
- Fu, Qiaomei; Hajdinjak, Mateja; Moldovan, Oana Teodora; Constantin, Silviu; Mallick, Swapan; Skoglund, Pontus; Patterson, Nick; Rohland, Nadin; Lazaridis, Iosif; Nickel, Birgit; Viola, Bence; Prüfer, Kay; Meyer, Matthias; Kelso, Janet; Reich, David (2015). "An early modern human from Romania with a recent Neanderthal ancestor". Nature. 524 (7564): 216–219. Bibcode:2015Natur.524..216F. doi:10.1038/nature14558. ISSN 1476-4687. PMC 4537386. PMID 26098372.
- Fu, Qiaomei; Posth, Cosimo; Hajdinjak, Mateja; Petr, Martin; Mallick, Swapan; Fernandes, Daniel; Furtwängler, Anja; Haak, Wolfgang; Meyer, Matthias; Mittnik, Alissa; Nickel, Birgit; Peltzer, Alexander; Rohland, Nadin; Slon, Viviane; Talamo, Sahra (9 June 2016). "The genetic history of Ice Age Europe". Nature. 534 (7606): 200–205. Bibcode:2016Natur.534..200F. doi:10.1038/nature17993. ISSN 0028-0836. PMC 4943878. PMID 27135931.
- Gao, Shizhu; Cui, Yinqiu (10 January 2023). "Ancient genomes reveal the origin and evolutionary history of Chinese populations". Frontiers in Earth Science. 10 1059196. Bibcode:2023FrEaS..1059196G. doi:10.3389/feart.2022.1059196. ISSN 2296-6463.
- Gelabert, P.; Sawyer, S.; Bergström, A.; Margaryan, A.; Collin, T. C.; Meshveliani, T.; Belfer-Cohen, A.; Lordkipanidze, D.; Jakeli, N.; Matskevich, Z.; Bar-Oz, G.; Fernandes, D. M.; Cheronet, O.; Özdoğan, K. T.; Oberreiter, V.; Feeney, R. N. M.; Stahlschmidt, M. C.; Skoglund, P.; Pinhasi, R. (2021). "Genome-scale sequencing and analysis of human, wolf, and bison DNA from 25,000-year-old sediment". Current Biology. 31 (16): 3564–3574.e9. Bibcode:2021CBio...31E3564G. doi:10.1016/j.cub.2021.06.023. PMC 8409484. PMID 34256019. S2CID 235802614.
- Gill, Haechan; Lee, Juhyeon; Jeong, Choongwon (2 April 2024). Eyre-Walker, Adam (ed.). "Reconstructing the Genetic Relationship between Ancient and Present-Day Siberian Populations". Genome Biology and Evolution. 16 (4) evae063. doi:10.1093/gbe/evae063. ISSN 1759-6653. PMC 10999361. PMID 38526010.
- Hajdinjak, Mateja; Fu, Qiaomei; Hübner, Alexander; Petr, Martin; Mafessoni, Fabrizio; Grote, Steffi; Skoglund, Pontus; Narasimham, Vagheesh; Rougier, Hélène; Crevecoeur, Isabelle; Semal, Patrick; Soressi, Marie; Talamo, Sahra; Hublin, Jean-Jacques; Gušić, Ivan (2018). "Reconstructing the genetic history of late Neanderthals". Nature. 555 (7698): 652–656. Bibcode:2018Natur.555..652H. doi:10.1038/nature26151. hdl:1887/70268. ISSN 1476-4687. PMC 6485383. PMID 29562232.
- Hajdinjak, Mateja; Mafessoni, Fabrizio; Skov, Laurits; Vernot, Benjamin; Hübner, Alexander; Fu, Qiaomei; Essel, Elena; Nagel, Sarah; Nickel, Birgit; Richter, Julia; Moldovan, Oana Teodora; Constantin, Silviu; Endarova, Elena; Zahariev, Nikolay; Spasov, Rosen (2021). "Initial Upper Palaeolithic humans in Europe had recent Neanderthal ancestry". Nature. 592 (7853): 253–257. Bibcode:2021Natur.592..253H. doi:10.1038/s41586-021-03335-3. ISSN 0028-0836. PMC 8026394. PMID 33828320.
- Harvati, K.; Ackermann, R. R. (2022). "Merging morphological and genetic evidence to assess hybridization in Western Eurasian late Pleistocene hominins". Nature Ecology & Evolution. 6 (10): 1573–1585. Bibcode:2022NatEE...6.1573H. doi:10.1038/s41559-022-01875-z. ISSN 2397-334X. PMID 36064759.
- Hawks, John (21 October 2013). "Significance of Neandertal and Denisovan Genomes in Human Evolution*". Annual Review of Anthropology. 42: 433–449. doi:10.1146/annurev-anthro-092412-155548. ISSN 0084-6570.
- Hervella, M.; Svensson, E. M.; Alberdi, A.; Günther, T.; Izagirre, N.; Munters, A. R.; Alonso, S.; Ioana, M.; Ridiche, F.; Soficaru, A.; Jakobsson, M.; Netea, M. G.; de-la-Rua, C. (19 May 2016). "The mitogenome of a 35,000-year-old Homo sapiens from Europe supports a Palaeolithic back-migration to Africa". Scientific Reports. 6 (1) 25501. Bibcode:2016NatSR...625501H. doi:10.1038/srep25501. ISSN 2045-2322. PMC 4872530. PMID 27195518.
- Higgins, Owen Alexander; Modi, Alessandra; Cannariato, Costanza; Diroma, Maria Angela; Lugli, Federico; Ricci, Stefano; Zaro, Valentina; Vai, Stefania; Vazzana, Antonino; Romandini, Matteo; Yu, He; Boschin, Francesco; Magnone, Luigi; Rossini, Matteo; Di Domenico, Giovanni (20 September 2024). "Life history and ancestry of the late Upper Palaeolithic infant from Grotta delle Mura, Italy". Nature Communications. 15 (1): 8248. Bibcode:2024NatCo..15.8248H. doi:10.1038/s41467-024-51150-x. ISSN 2041-1723. PMC 11415373. PMID 39304646.
- Hollfelder, Nina; Breton, Gwenna; Sjödin, Per; Jakobsson, Mattias (26 April 2021). "The deep population history in Africa". Human Molecular Genetics. 30 (R1): R2–R10. doi:10.1093/hmg/ddab005. ISSN 0964-6906. PMC 8117439. PMID 33438014.
- Hublin, Jean-Jacques; Sirakov, Nikolay; Aldeias, Vera; Bailey, Shara; Bard, Edouard; Delvigne, Vincent; Endarova, Elena; Fagault, Yoann; Fewlass, Helen; Hajdinjak, Mateja; Kromer, Bernd; Krumov, Ivaylo; Marreiros, João; Martisius, Naomi L.; Paskulin, Lindsey (21 May 2020). "Initial Upper Palaeolithic Homo sapiens from Bacho Kiro Cave, Bulgaria". Nature. 581 (7808): 299–302. Bibcode:2020Natur.581..299H. doi:10.1038/s41586-020-2259-z. ISSN 0028-0836. PMID 32433609.
- Irving-Pease, Evan K.; Refoyo-Martínez, Alba; Barrie, William; Ingason, Andrés; Pearson, Alice; Fischer, Anders; Sjögren, Karl-Göran; Halgren, Alma S.; Macleod, Ruairidh; Demeter, Fabrice; Henriksen, Rasmus A.; Vimala, Tharsika; McColl, Hugh; Vaughn, Andrew H.; Speidel, Leo (2024). "The selection landscape and genetic legacy of ancient Eurasians". Nature. 625 (7994): 312–320. Bibcode:2024Natur.625..312I. doi:10.1038/s41586-023-06705-1. ISSN 1476-4687. PMC 10781624. PMID 38200293.
- Jeong, Choongwon; Balanovsky, Oleg; Lukianova, Elena; Kahbatkyzy, Nurzhibek; Flegontov, Pavel; Zaporozhchenko, Valery; Immel, Alexander; Wang, Chuan-Chao; Ixan, Olzhas; Khussainova, Elmira; Bekmanov, Bakhytzhan; Zaibert, Victor; Lavryashina, Maria; Pocheshkhova, Elvira; Yusupov, Yuldash (29 April 2019). "The genetic history of admixture across inner Eurasia". Nature Ecology & Evolution. 3 (6): 966–976. Bibcode:2019NatEE...3..966J. doi:10.1038/s41559-019-0878-2. ISSN 2397-334X. PMC 6542712. PMID 31036896.
- Jones, Eppie R.; Gonzalez-Fortes, Gloria; Connell, Sarah; Siska, Veronika; Eriksson, Anders; Martiniano, Rui; McLaughlin, Russell L.; Gallego Llorente, Marcos; Cassidy, Lara M.; Gamba, Cristina; Meshveliani, Tengiz; Bar-Yosef, Ofer; Müller, Werner; Belfer-Cohen, Anna; Matskevich, Zinovi (16 November 2015). "Upper Palaeolithic genomes reveal deep roots of modern Eurasians". Nature Communications. 6 (1) 8912. Bibcode:2015NatCo...6.8912J. doi:10.1038/ncomms9912. ISSN 2041-1723. PMC 4660371. PMID 26567969.
- Kerdoncuff, Elise; Skov, Laurits; Patterson, Nick; Banerjee, Joyita; Khobragade, Pranali; Chakrabarti, Sankha S.; Chakrawarty, Avinash; Chatterjee, Prasun; Dhar, Minakshi; Gupta, Monica; John, John P.; Koul, Parvaiz A.; Lehl, Sarabmeet S.; Mohanty, Rashmi R.; Padmaja, Mekala (26 June 2025). "50,000 years of evolutionary history of India: Impact on health and disease variation". Cell. 188 (13): 3389–3404.e6. doi:10.1016/j.cell.2025.04.027. ISSN 0092-8674. PMC 12376946. PMID 40578318.
- Kılınç, Gülşah Merve; Kashuba, Natalija; Koptekin, Dilek; Bergfeldt, Nora; Dönertaş, Handan Melike; Rodríguez-Varela, Ricardo; Shergin, Dmitrij; Ivanov, Grigorij; Kichigin, Dmitrii; Pestereva, Kjunnej; Volkov, Denis; Mandryka, Pavel; Kharinskii, Artur; Tishkin, Alexey; Ineshin, Evgenij (8 January 2021). "Human population dynamics and Yersinia pestis in ancient northeast Asia". Science Advances. 7 (2) eabc4587. Bibcode:2021SciA....7.4587K. doi:10.1126/sciadv.abc4587. ISSN 2375-2548. PMC 7787494. PMID 33523963.
- Lalueza-Fox, Carles (2021). "Neanderthal assimilation?". Nature Ecology & Evolution. 5 (6): 711–712. Bibcode:2021NatEE...5..711L. doi:10.1038/s41559-021-01421-3. ISSN 2397-334X. PMID 33828250.
- Langdon, John H. (2022). Human Evolution: Bones, Cultures, and Genes. Springer Texts in Social Sciences (1st ed. 2022 ed.). Cham: Springer International Publishing. ISBN 978-3-031-14157-7.
- Lazaridis, Iosif; Nadel, Dani; Rollefson, Gary; Merrett, Deborah C.; Rohland, Nadin; Mallick, Swapan; Fernandes, Daniel; Novak, Mario; Gamarra, Beatriz; Sirak, Kendra; Connell, Sarah; Stewardson, Kristin; Harney, Eadaoin; Fu, Qiaomei; Gonzalez-Fortes, Gloria (25 August 2016). "Genomic insights into the origin of farming in the ancient Near East". Nature. 536 (7617): 419–424. Bibcode:2016Natur.536..419L. doi:10.1038/nature19310. ISSN 0028-0836. PMC 5003663. PMID 27459054.
- Lazaridis, Iosif; Alpaslan-Roodenberg, Songül; Acar, Ayşe; Açıkkol, Ayşen; Agelarakis, Anagnostis; Aghikyan, Levon; Akyüz, Uğur; Andreeva, Desislava; Andrijašević, Gojko; Antonović, Dragana; Armit, Ian; Atmaca, Alper; Avetisyan, Pavel; Aytek, Ahmet İhsan; Bacvarov, Krum (26 August 2022). "Ancient DNA from Mesopotamia suggests distinct Pre-Pottery and Pottery Neolithic migrations into Anatolia". Science. 377 (6609): 982–987. Bibcode:2022Sci...377..982L. doi:10.1126/science.abq0762. ISSN 0036-8075. PMC 9983685. PMID 36007054.
- Li, Liming; Comi, Troy J.; Bierman, Rob F.; Akey, Joshua M. (12 July 2024). "Recurrent gene flow between Neanderthals and modern humans over the past 200,000 years". Science. 385 (6705) eadi1768. Bibcode:2024Sci...385i1768L. doi:10.1126/science.adi1768. ISSN 0036-8075. PMC 12885488. PMID 38991054.
- Lindqvist, Charlotte; Rajora, Om P., eds. (2019). "Paleogenomics". Population Genomics. doi:10.1007/978-3-030-04753-5. ISBN 978-3-030-04752-8. ISSN 2364-6764.
- Lipson, Mark; Szécsényi-Nagy, Anna; Mallick, Swapan; Pósa, Annamária; Stégmár, Balázs; Keerl, Victoria; Rohland, Nadin; Stewardson, Kristin; Ferry, Matthew; Michel, Megan; Oppenheimer, Jonas; Broomandkhoshbacht, Nasreen; Harney, Eadaoin; Nordenfelt, Susanne; Llamas, Bastien (2017). "Parallel palaeogenomic transects reveal complex genetic history of early European farmers". Nature. 551 (7680): 368–372. Bibcode:2017Natur.551..368L. doi:10.1038/nature24476. ISSN 1476-4687. PMC 5973800. PMID 29144465.
- Lipson, Mark; Ribot, Isabelle; Mallick, Swapan; Rohland, Nadin; Olalde, Iñigo; Adamski, Nicole; Broomandkhoshbacht, Nasreen; Lawson, Ann Marie; López, Saioa; Oppenheimer, Jonas; Stewardson, Kristin; Asombang, Raymond Neba'ane; Bocherens, Hervé; Bradman, Neil; Culleton, Brendan J. (2020). "Ancient West African foragers in the context of African population history". Nature. 577 (7792): 665–670. Bibcode:2020Natur.577..665L. doi:10.1038/s41586-020-1929-1. hdl:2013/ULB-DIPOT:oai:dipot.ulb.ac.be:2013/301758. ISSN 1476-4687. PMC 8386425. PMID 31969706.
- Lipson, Mark; Sawchuk, Elizabeth A.; Thompson, Jessica C.; Oppenheimer, Jonas; Tryon, Christian A.; Ranhorn, Kathryn L.; de Luna, Kathryn M.; Sirak, Kendra A.; Olalde, Iñigo; Ambrose, Stanley H.; Arthur, John W.; Arthur, Kathryn J. W.; Ayodo, George; Bertacchi, Alex; Cerezo-Román, Jessica I. (2022). "Ancient DNA and deep population structure in sub-Saharan African foragers". Nature. 603 (7900): 290–296. Bibcode:2022Natur.603..290L. doi:10.1038/s41586-022-04430-9. ISSN 1476-4687. PMC 8907066. PMID 35197631.
- Lipson, Mark; Ringbauer, Harald; Lucarini, Giulio; Aouadi, Nabiha; Aoudia, Louiza; Belhouchet, Lotfi; Cheronet, Olivia; Dahmani, Ariane-Rym; Genchi, Francesco; La Pastina, Francesco; Lucci, Michaela; de Lumley, Henry; Mansouri, Nabila; Nava, Alessia; Touj, Fatma (22 May 2025). "High continuity of forager ancestry in the Neolithic period of the eastern Maghreb". Nature. 641 (8064): 925–931. doi:10.1038/s41586-025-08699-4. ISSN 0028-0836. PMC 12094895. PMID 40074896.
- Liu, Yichen; Mao, Xiaowei; Krause, Johannes; Fu, Qiaomei (24 September 2021). "Insights into human history from the first decade of ancient human genomics". Science. 373 (6562): 1479–1484. Bibcode:2021Sci...373.1479L. doi:10.1126/science.abi8202. ISSN 0036-8075. PMID 34554811.
- Lucas-Sánchez, Marcel; Serradell, Jose M; Comas, David (26 April 2021). "Population history of North Africa based on modern and ancient genomes". Human Molecular Genetics. 30 (R1): R17–R23. doi:10.1093/hmg/ddaa261. ISSN 0964-6906. PMID 33284971.
- Mafessoni, Fabrizio; Grote, Steffi; de Filippo, Cesare; Slon, Viviane; Kolobova, Kseniya A.; Viola, Bence; Markin, Sergey V.; Chintalapati, Manjusha; Peyrégne, Stephane; Skov, Laurits; Skoglund, Pontus; Krivoshapkin, Andrey I.; Derevianko, Anatoly P.; Meyer, Matthias; Kelso, Janet (30 June 2020). "A high-coverage Neandertal genome from Chagyrskaya Cave". Proceedings of the National Academy of Sciences. 117 (26): 15132–15136. Bibcode:2020PNAS..11715132M. doi:10.1073/pnas.2004944117. PMC 7334501. PMID 32546518.
- Maier, Robert; Flegontov, Pavel; Flegontova, Olga; Işıldak, Ulaş; Changmai, Piya; Reich, David (29 June 2023). "On the limits of fitting complex models of population history to f-statistics". eLife. 12 e85492. Bibcode:2023eLife..1285492M. doi:10.7554/eLife.85492. ISSN 2050-084X. PMC 10310323. PMID 37057893.
- Mallick, Swapan; Micco, Adam; Mah, Matthew; Ringbauer, Harald; Lazaridis, Iosif; Olalde, Iñigo; Patterson, Nick; Reich, David (2024). "The Allen Ancient DNA Resource (AADR) a curated compendium of ancient human genomes". Scientific Data. 11 (1) 182. Bibcode:2024NatSD..11..182M. doi:10.1038/s41597-024-03031-7. ISSN 2052-4463. PMC 10858950. PMID 38341426.
- Mao, Xiaowei; Zhang, Hucai; Qiao, Shiyu; Liu, Yichen; Chang, Fengqin; Xie, Ping; Zhang, Ming; Wang, Tianyi; Li, Mian; Cao, Peng; Yang, Ruowei; Liu, Feng; Dai, Qingyan; Feng, Xiaotian; Ping, Wanjing (10 June 2021). "The deep population history of northern East Asia from the Late Pleistocene to the Holocene". Cell. 184 (12): 3256–3266.e13. Bibcode:2021Cell..184.3256M. doi:10.1016/j.cell.2021.04.040. ISSN 0092-8674. PMID 34048699.
- Marchi, Nina; Winkelbach, Laura; Schulz, Ilektra; Brami, Maxime; Hofmanová, Zuzana; Blöcher, Jens; Reyna-Blanco, Carlos S.; Diekmann, Yoan; Thiéry, Alexandre; Kapopoulou, Adamandia; Link, Vivian; Piuz, Valérie; Kreutzer, Susanne; Figarska, Sylwia M.; Ganiatsou, Elissavet (2022). "The genomic origins of the world's first farmers". Cell. 185 (11): 1842–1859.e18. doi:10.1016/j.cell.2022.04.008. PMC 9166250. PMID 35561686.
- Massilani, Diyendo; Skov, Laurits; Hajdinjak, Mateja; Gunchinsuren, Byambaa; Tseveendorj, Damdinsuren; Yi, Seonbok; Lee, Jungeun; Nagel, Sarah; Nickel, Birgit; Devièse, Thibaut; Higham, Tom; Meyer, Matthias; Kelso, Janet; Peter, Benjamin M.; Pääbo, Svante (30 October 2020). "Denisovan ancestry and population history of early East Asians". Science. 370 (6516): 579–583. doi:10.1126/science.abc1166. ISSN 0036-8075. PMID 33122380.
- Mathieson, Iain; Alpaslan-Roodenberg, Songül; Posth, Cosimo; Szécsényi-Nagy, Anna; Rohland, Nadin; Mallick, Swapan; Olalde, Iñigo; Broomandkhoshbacht, Nasreen; Candilio, Francesca; Cheronet, Olivia; Fernandes, Daniel; Ferry, Matthew; Gamarra, Beatriz; Fortes, Gloria González; Haak, Wolfgang (2018). "The genomic history of southeastern Europe". Nature. 555 (7695): 197–203. Bibcode:2018Natur.555..197M. doi:10.1038/nature25778. hdl:10447/273248. ISSN 1476-4687. PMC 6091220. PMID 29466330.
- Meyer, Matthias; Kircher, Martin; Gansauge, Marie-Theres; Li, Heng; Racimo, Fernando; Mallick, Swapan; Schraiber, Joshua G.; Jay, Flora; Prüfer, Kay; de Filippo, Cesare; Sudmant, Peter H.; Alkan, Can; Fu, Qiaomei; Do, Ron; Rohland, Nadin (12 October 2012). "A High-Coverage Genome Sequence from an Archaic Denisovan Individual". Science. 338 (6104): 222–226. Bibcode:2012Sci...338..222M. doi:10.1126/science.1224344. ISSN 0036-8075. PMC 3617501. PMID 22936568.
- Meyer, Matthias; Fu, Qiaomei; Aximu-Petri, Ayinuer; Glocke, Isabelle; Nickel, Birgit; Arsuaga, Juan-Luis; Martínez, Ignacio; Gracia, Ana; de Castro, José María Bermúdez; Carbonell, Eudald; Pääbo, Svante (2014). "A mitochondrial genome sequence of a hominin from Sima de los Huesos". Nature. 505 (7483): 403–406. Bibcode:2014Natur.505..403M. doi:10.1038/nature12788. ISSN 0028-0836. PMID 24305051.
- Meyer, Matthias; Arsuaga, Juan-Luis; de Filippo, Cesare; Nagel, Sarah; Aximu-Petri, Ayinuer; Nickel, Birgit; Martínez, Ignacio; Gracia, Ana; de Castro, José María Bermúdez; Carbonell, Eudald; Viola, Bence; Kelso, Janet; Prüfer, Kay; Pääbo, Svante (24 March 2016). "Nuclear DNA sequences from the Middle Pleistocene Sima de los Huesos hominins". Nature. 531 (7595): 504–507. Bibcode:2016Natur.531..504M. doi:10.1038/nature17405. hdl:11858/00-001M-0000-002A-0B82-0. ISSN 0028-0836. PMID 26976447.
- Mizuno, Fuzuki; Gojobori, Jun; Kumagai, Masahiko; Baba, Hisao; Taniguchi, Yasuhiro; Kondo, Osamu; Matsushita, Masami; Matsushita, Takayuki; Matsuda, Fumihiko; Higasa, Koichiro; Hayashi, Michiko; Wang, Li; Kurosaki, Kunihiko; Ueda, Shintaroh (13 June 2021). "Population dynamics in the Japanese Archipelago since the Pleistocene revealed by the complete mitochondrial genome sequences". Scientific Reports. 11 (1) 12018. Bibcode:2021NatSR..1112018M. doi:10.1038/s41598-021-91357-2. ISSN 2045-2322. PMC 8200360. PMID 34121089.
- Moreno-Mayar, J. Víctor; Potter, Ben A.; Vinner, Lasse; Steinrücken, Matthias; Rasmussen, Simon; Terhorst, Jonathan; Kamm, John A.; Albrechtsen, Anders; Malaspinas, Anna-Sapfo; Sikora, Martin; Reuther, Joshua D.; Irish, Joel D.; Malhi, Ripan S.; Orlando, Ludovic; Song, Yun S. (2018). "Terminal Pleistocene Alaskan genome reveals first founding population of Native Americans". Nature. 553 (7687): 203–207. Bibcode:2018Natur.553..203M. doi:10.1038/nature25173. ISSN 0028-0836. PMID 29323294.
- Moreno-Mayar, J. Víctor; Vinner, Lasse; de Barros Damgaard, Peter; de la Fuente, Constanza; Chan, Jeffrey; Spence, Jeffrey P.; Allentoft, Morten E.; Vimala, Tharsika; Racimo, Fernando; Pinotti, Thomaz; Rasmussen, Simon; Margaryan, Ashot; Iraeta Orbegozo, Miren; Mylopotamitaki, Dorothea; Wooller, Matthew (7 December 2018). "Early human dispersals within the Americas". Science. 362 (6419) eaav2621. Bibcode:2018Sci...362.2621M. doi:10.1126/science.aav2621. ISSN 0036-8075. PMID 30409807.
- Muñoz-Moreno, María de Lourdes; Crawford, Michael Herman (2021). Human migration: biocultural perspectives. New York: Oxford University Press. ISBN 978-0-19-094596-1.
- Nägele, Kathrin; Rivollat, Maite; Yu, He; Wang, Ke (2022). "Ancient genomic research - From broad strokes to nuanced reconstructions of the past" (PDF). Journal of Anthropological Sciences. 100 (100): 193–230. doi:10.4436/JASS.10017. ISSN 1827-4765. PMID 36576953.
- Olalde, Iñigo; Posth, Cosimo (1 June 2020). "Latest trends in archaeogenetic research of west Eurasians". Current Opinion in Genetics & Development. Genetics of Human Origin. 62: 36–43. doi:10.1016/j.gde.2020.05.021. ISSN 0959-437X. PMID 32610222.
- Ongaro, Linda; Huerta-Sanchez, Emilia (2024). "A history of multiple Denisovan introgression events in modern humans". Nature Genetics. 56 (12): 2612–2622. doi:10.1038/s41588-024-01960-y. hdl:2262/110305. ISSN 1546-1718. PMID 39501127.
- Orlando, Ludovic (2 March 2023). "The genomic history of ice-age Europeans". Nature. 615 (7950): 41–42. Bibcode:2023Natur.615...41O. doi:10.1038/d41586-023-00371-z. ISSN 0028-0836. PMID 36859577.
- O'Rourke, Dennis H., ed. (2019). A companion to anthropological genetics. Blackwell companions to anthropology. Hoboken, NJ, USA: Wiley-Blackwell. ISBN 978-1-118-76899-0.
- Osada, Naoki; Kawai, Yosuke (2021). "Exploring models of human migration to the Japanese archipelago using genome-wide genetic data". Anthropological Science. 129 (1): 45–58. doi:10.1537/ase.201215. ISSN 0918-7960.
- Pearson, Alice (2022). Ancestral Paths: Redefining local genetic ancestry and its inference with application to Europeans (Thesis).
- Perri, Angela R.; Feuerborn, Tatiana R.; Frantz, Laurent A. F.; Larson, Greger; Malhi, Ripan S.; Meltzer, David J.; Witt, Kelsey E. (9 February 2021). "Dog domestication and the dual dispersal of people and dogs into the Americas". Proceedings of the National Academy of Sciences. 118 (6) e2010083118. Bibcode:2021PNAS..11810083P. doi:10.1073/pnas.2010083118. ISSN 0027-8424. PMC 8017920. PMID 33495362.
- Petr, Martin; Hajdinjak, Mateja; Fu, Qiaomei; Essel, Elena; Rougier, Hélène; Crevecoeur, Isabelle; Semal, Patrick; Golovanova, Liubov V.; Doronichev, Vladimir B.; Lalueza-Fox, Carles; de la Rasilla, Marco; Rosas, Antonio; Shunkov, Michael V.; Kozlikin, Maxim B.; Derevianko, Anatoli P. (25 September 2020). "The evolutionary history of Neanderthal and Denisovan Y chromosomes". Science. 369 (6511): 1653–1656. Bibcode:2020Sci...369.1653P. doi:10.1126/science.abb6460. ISSN 0036-8075. PMID 32973032.
- Peyrégne, Stéphane; Slon, Viviane; Mafessoni, Fabrizio; de Filippo, Cesare; Hajdinjak, Mateja; Nagel, Sarah; Nickel, Birgit; Essel, Elena; Le Cabec, Adeline; Wehrberger, Kurt; Conard, Nicholas J.; Kind, Claus Joachim; Posth, Cosimo; Krause, Johannes; Abrams, Grégory (26 June 2019). "Nuclear DNA from two early Neandertals reveals 80,000 years of genetic continuity in Europe". Science Advances. 5 (6) eaaw5873. Bibcode:2019SciA....5.5873P. doi:10.1126/sciadv.aaw5873. PMC 6594762. PMID 31249872.
- Peyrégne, Stéphane; Slon, Viviane; Kelso, Janet (2024). "More than a decade of genetic research on the Denisovans". Nature Reviews Genetics. 25 (2): 83–103. doi:10.1038/s41576-023-00643-4. ISSN 1471-0064. PMID 37723347.
- Pfennig, Aaron; Petersen, Lindsay N; Kachambwa, Paidamoyo; Lachance, Joseph (6 April 2023). Eyre-Walker, Adam (ed.). "Evolutionary Genetics and Admixture in African Populations". Genome Biology and Evolution. 15 (4) evad054. doi:10.1093/gbe/evad054. ISSN 1759-6653. PMC 10118306. PMID 36987563.
- Picin, Andrea; Hajdinjak, Mateja; Nowaczewska, Wioletta; Benazzi, Stefano; Urbanowski, Mikołaj; Marciszak, Adrian; Fewlass, Helen; Bosch, Marjolein D.; Socha, Paweł; Stefaniak, Krzysztof; Żarski, Marcin; Wiśniewski, Andrzej; Hublin, Jean-Jacques; Nadachowski, Adam; Talamo, Sahra (8 September 2020). "New perspectives on Neanderthal dispersal and turnover from Stajnia Cave (Poland)". Scientific Reports. 10 (1): 14778. Bibcode:2020NatSR..1014778P. doi:10.1038/s41598-020-71504-x. ISSN 2045-2322. PMC 7479612. PMID 32901061.
- Pirson, Stéphane; Toussaint, Michel; Bonjean, Dominique; Di Modica, Kévin (2018), "Spy and Scladina Caves: A Neandertal's Story", in Demoulin, Alain (ed.), Landscapes and Landforms of Belgium and Luxembourg, Cham: Springer International Publishing, pp. 357–383, doi:10.1007/978-3-319-58239-9_21, ISBN 978-3-319-58237-5
- Posth, Cosimo; Wißing, Christoph; Kitagawa, Keiko; Pagani, Luca; van Holstein, Laura; Racimo, Fernando; Wehrberger, Kurt; Conard, Nicholas J.; Kind, Claus Joachim; Bocherens, Hervé; Krause, Johannes (4 July 2017). "Deeply divergent archaic mitochondrial genome provides lower time boundary for African gene flow into Neanderthals". Nature Communications. 8 (1) 16046. Bibcode:2017NatCo...816046P. doi:10.1038/ncomms16046. ISSN 2041-1723. PMC 5500885. PMID 28675384.
- Posth, Cosimo; Nakatsuka, Nathan; Lazaridis, Iosif; Skoglund, Pontus; Mallick, Swapan; Lamnidis, Thiseas C.; Rohland, Nadin; Nägele, Kathrin; Adamski, Nicole; Bertolini, Emilie; Broomandkhoshbacht, Nasreen; Cooper, Alan; Culleton, Brendan J.; Ferraz, Tiago; Ferry, Matthew (2018). "Reconstructing the Deep Population History of Central and South America". Cell. 175 (5): 1185–1197.e22. doi:10.1016/j.cell.2018.10.027. hdl:10550/67985. PMC 6327247. PMID 30415837.
- Posth, Cosimo; Yu, He; Ghalichi, Ayshin; Rougier, Hélène; Crevecoeur, Isabelle; Huang, Yilei; Ringbauer, Harald; Rohrlach, Adam B.; Nägele, Kathrin; Villalba-Mouco, Vanessa; Radzeviciute, Rita; Ferraz, Tiago; Stoessel, Alexander; Tukhbatova, Rezeda; Drucker, Dorothée G. (2 March 2023). "Palaeogenomics of Upper Palaeolithic to Neolithic European hunter-gatherers". Nature. 615 (7950): 117–126. Bibcode:2023Natur.615..117P. doi:10.1038/s41586-023-05726-0. ISSN 0028-0836. PMC 9977688. PMID 36859578.
- Potter, Ben A.; Irish, Joel D.; Reuther, Joshua D.; McKinney, Holly J. (2 December 2014). "New insights into Eastern Beringian mortuary behavior: A terminal Pleistocene double infant burial at Upward Sun River". Proceedings of the National Academy of Sciences. 111 (48): 17060–17065. Bibcode:2014PNAS..11117060P. doi:10.1073/pnas.1413131111. ISSN 0027-8424. PMC 4260572. PMID 25385599.
- Potter, Ben (2020). Integrating ancient genetic and archaeological patterns for the peopling of Northeast Asia and the Americas. in Proceedings of the 34th International Abashiri Symposium. Tradition and Culture of North Pacific Rim Area 4 Alaska and Yukon Area. pp. 15–16.
- Prendergast, Mary E.; Sawchuk, Elizabeth A.; Sirak, Kendra A. (19 October 2022), "Genetics and the African Past", Oxford Research Encyclopedia of African History, doi:10.1093/acrefore/9780190277734.013.143, ISBN 978-0-19-027773-4
- Prüfer, Kay; Racimo, Fernando; Patterson, Nick; Jay, Flora; Sankararaman, Sriram; Sawyer, Susanna; Heinze, Anja; Renaud, Gabriel; Sudmant, Peter H.; de Filippo, Cesare; Li, Heng; Mallick, Swapan; Dannemann, Michael; Fu, Qiaomei; Kircher, Martin (2014). "The complete genome sequence of a Neanderthal from the Altai Mountains". Nature. 505 (7481): 43–49. Bibcode:2014Natur.505...43P. doi:10.1038/nature12886. ISSN 1476-4687. PMC 4031459. PMID 24352235.
- Prüfer, Kay; de Filippo, Cesare; Grote, Steffi; Mafessoni, Fabrizio; Korlević, Petra; Hajdinjak, Mateja; Vernot, Benjamin; Skov, Laurits; Hsieh, Pinghsun; Peyrégne, Stéphane; Reher, David; Hopfe, Charlotte; Nagel, Sarah; Maricic, Tomislav; Fu, Qiaomei (3 November 2017). "A high-coverage Neandertal genome from Vindija Cave in Croatia". Science. 358 (6363): 655–658. Bibcode:2017Sci...358..655P. doi:10.1126/science.aao1887. PMC 6185897. PMID 28982794.
- Prüfer, Kay; Posth, Cosimo; Yu, He; Stoessel, Alexander; Spyrou, Maria A.; Deviese, Thibaut; Mattonai, Marco; Ribechini, Erika; Higham, Thomas; Velemínský, Petr; Brůžek, Jaroslav; Krause, Johannes (2021). "A genome sequence from a modern human skull over 45,000 years old from Zlatý kůň in Czechia". Nature Ecology & Evolution. 5 (6): 820–825. Bibcode:2021NatEE...5..820P. doi:10.1038/s41559-021-01443-x. ISSN 2397-334X. PMC 8175239. PMID 33828249.
- Raghavan, Maanasa; Skoglund, Pontus; Graf, Kelly E.; Metspalu, Mait; Albrechtsen, Anders; Moltke, Ida; Rasmussen, Simon; Stafford Jr, Thomas W.; Orlando, Ludovic; Metspalu, Ene; Karmin, Monika; Tambets, Kristiina; Rootsi, Siiri; Mägi, Reedik; Campos, Paula F. (2014). "Upper Palaeolithic Siberian genome reveals dual ancestry of Native Americans". Nature. 505 (7481): 87–91. Bibcode:2014Natur.505...87R. doi:10.1038/nature12736. ISSN 1476-4687. PMC 4105016. PMID 24256729.
- Raghavan, Maanasa; Steinrücken, Matthias; Harris, Kelley; Schiffels, Stephan; Rasmussen, Simon; DeGiorgio, Michael; Albrechtsen, Anders; Valdiosera, Cristina; Ávila-Arcos, María C.; Malaspinas, Anna-Sapfo; Eriksson, Anders; Moltke, Ida; Metspalu, Mait; Homburger, Julian R.; Wall, Jeff (21 August 2015). "Genomic evidence for the Pleistocene and recent population history of Native Americans". Science. 349 (6250) aab3884. Bibcode:2015Sci...349b3884R. doi:10.1126/science.aab3884. ISSN 0036-8075. PMC 4733658. PMID 26198033.
- Rasmussen, Morten; Anzick, Sarah L.; Waters, Michael R.; Skoglund, Pontus; DeGiorgio, Michael; Stafford, Thomas W.; Rasmussen, Simon; Moltke, Ida; Albrechtsen, Anders; Doyle, Shane M.; Poznik, G. David; Gudmundsdottir, Valborg; Yadav, Rachita; Malaspinas, Anna-Sapfo; V, Samuel Stockton White (2014). "The genome of a Late Pleistocene human from a Clovis burial site in western Montana". Nature. 506 (7487): 225–229. Bibcode:2014Natur.506..225R. doi:10.1038/nature13025. ISSN 1476-4687. PMC 4878442. PMID 24522598.
- Rathmann, Hannes; Vizzari, Maria T.; Beier, Judith; Bailey, Shara E.; Ghirotto, Silvia; Harvati, Katerina (16 August 2024). "Human population dynamics in Upper Paleolithic Europe inferred from fossil dental phenotypes". Science Advances. 10 (33) eadn8129. Bibcode:2024SciA...10N8129R. doi:10.1126/sciadv.adn8129. ISSN 2375-2548. PMC 11328903. PMID 39151011.
- Reich, David (2018). Who we are and how we got here: ancient DNA and the new science of the human past (1 ed.). Oxford: Oxford university press. ISBN 978-0-19-882125-0.
- Ríos, L.; Kivell, T. L.; Lalueza-Fox, C.; Estalrrich, A.; García-Tabernero, A.; Huguet, R.; Quintino, Y.; de la Rasilla, M.; Rosas, A. (8 February 2019). "Skeletal Anomalies in The Neandertal Family of El Sidrón (Spain) Support A Role of Inbreeding in Neandertal Extinction". Scientific Reports. 9 (1): 1697. Bibcode:2019NatSR...9.1697R. doi:10.1038/s41598-019-38571-1. ISSN 2045-2322. PMC 6368597. PMID 30737446.
- Romagnoli, Francesca; Rivals, Florent; Benazzi, Stefano, eds. (2022). Updating neanderthals: understanding behavioral complexity in the Late Middle Paleolithic. London, UK: Academic Press, an imprint of Elsevier. ISBN 978-0-12-821428-2. OCLC 1328027813.
- Rougier, Hélène; Milota, Ştefan; Rodrigo, Ricardo; Gherase, Mircea; Sarcinǎ, Laurenţiu; Moldovan, Oana; Zilhão, João; Constantin, Silviu; Franciscus, Robert G.; Zollikofer, Christoph P. E.; Ponce de León, Marcia; Trinkaus, Erik (23 January 2007). "Peştera cu Oase 2 and the cranial morphology of early modern Europeans". Proceedings of the National Academy of Sciences. 104 (4): 1165–1170. Bibcode:2007PNAS..104.1165R. doi:10.1073/pnas.0610538104. ISSN 0027-8424. PMC 1783092. PMID 17227863.
- Rougier, Hélène; Crevecoeur, Isabelle; Beauval, Cédric; Posth, Cosimo; Flas, Damien; Wißing, Christoph; Furtwängler, Anja; Germonpré, Mietje; Gómez-Olivencia, Asier; Semal, Patrick; van der Plicht, Johannes; Bocherens, Hervé; Krause, Johannes (6 July 2016). "Neandertal cannibalism and Neandertal bones used as tools in Northern Europe". Scientific Reports. 6 (1) 29005. Bibcode:2016NatSR...629005R. doi:10.1038/srep29005. ISSN 2045-2322. PMC 4933918. PMID 27381450.
- Saag, Lehti; Vasilyev, Sergey V.; Varul, Liivi; Kosorukova, Natalia V.; Gerasimov, Dmitri V.; Oshibkina, Svetlana V.; Griffith, Samuel J.; Solnik, Anu; Saag, Lauri; D'Atanasio, Eugenia; Metspalu, Ene; Reidla, Maere; Rootsi, Siiri; Kivisild, Toomas; Scheib, Christiana Lyn (22 January 2021). "Genetic ancestry changes in Stone to Bronze Age transition in the East European plain". Science Advances. 7 (4) eabd6535. Bibcode:2021SciA....7.6535S. doi:10.1126/sciadv.abd6535. ISSN 2375-2548. PMC 7817100. PMID 33523926.
- Salem, Nada; van de Loosdrecht, Marieke S.; Sümer, Arev Pelin; Vai, Stefania; Hübner, Alexander; Peter, Benjamin; Bianco, Raffaela A.; Lari, Martina; Modi, Alessandra; Al-Faloos, Mohamed Faraj Mohamed; Turjman, Mustafa; Bouzouggar, Abdeljalil; Tafuri, Mary Anne; Manzi, Giorgio; Rotunno, Rocco (2 April 2025). "Ancient DNA from the Green Sahara reveals ancestral North African lineage". Nature. 641 (8061): 144–150. Bibcode:2025Natur.641..144S. doi:10.1038/s41586-025-08793-7. ISSN 0028-0836. PMC 12043513. PMID 40175549.
- Serradell, Jose M.; Lorenzo-Salazar, Jose M.; Flores, Carlos; Lao, Oscar; Comas, David (30 July 2024). "Modelling the demographic history of human North African genomes points to a recent soft split divergence between populations". Genome Biology. 25 (1) 201. doi:10.1186/s13059-024-03341-4. ISSN 1474-760X. PMC 11290046. PMID 39080715.
- Serrano, Javier G.; Ordóñez, Alejandra C.; Fregel, Rosa (3 April 2021). "Paleogenomics of the prehistory of Europe: human migrations, domestication and disease". Annals of Human Biology. 48 (3): 179–190. doi:10.1080/03014460.2021.1942205. ISSN 0301-4460. PMID 34459342.
- Shinde, Vasant; Narasimhan, Vagheesh M.; Rohland, Nadin; Mallick, Swapan; Mah, Matthew; Lipson, Mark; Nakatsuka, Nathan; Adamski, Nicole; Broomandkhoshbacht, Nasreen; Ferry, Matthew; Lawson, Ann Marie; Michel, Megan; Oppenheimer, Jonas; Stewardson, Kristin; Jadhav, Nilesh (2019). "An Ancient Harappan Genome Lacks Ancestry from Steppe Pastoralists or Iranian Farmers". Cell. 179 (3): 729–735.e10. doi:10.1016/j.cell.2019.08.048. PMC 6800651. PMID 31495572.
- Sikora, Martin; Seguin-Orlando, Andaine; Sousa, Vitor C.; Albrechtsen, Anders; Korneliussen, Thorfinn; Ko, Amy; Rasmussen, Simon; Dupanloup, Isabelle; Nigst, Philip R.; Bosch, Marjolein D.; Renaud, Gabriel; Allentoft, Morten E.; Margaryan, Ashot; Vasilyev, Sergey V.; Veselovskaya, Elizaveta V. (3 November 2017). "Ancient genomes show social and reproductive behavior of early Upper Paleolithic foragers". Science. 358 (6363): 659–662. Bibcode:2017Sci...358..659S. doi:10.1126/science.aao1807. ISSN 0036-8075. PMID 28982795.
- Sikora, Martin; Pitulko, Vladimir V.; Sousa, Vitor C.; Allentoft, Morten E.; Vinner, Lasse; Rasmussen, Simon; Margaryan, Ashot; de Barros Damgaard, Peter; de la Fuente, Constanza; Renaud, Gabriel; Yang, Melinda A.; Fu, Qiaomei; Dupanloup, Isabelle; Giampoudakis, Konstantinos; Nogués-Bravo, David (2019). "The population history of northeastern Siberia since the Pleistocene". Nature. 570 (7760): 182–188. Bibcode:2019Natur.570..182S. doi:10.1038/s41586-019-1279-z. hdl:1887/3198847. ISSN 1476-4687. PMC 7617447. PMID 31168093.
- Silva, Marcos Araújo Castro e; Ferraz, Tiago; Hünemeier, Tábita (2022). "A genomic perspective on South American human history". Genetics and Molecular Biology. 45 (3 suppl 1) e20220078. doi:10.1590/1678-4685-gmb-2022-0078. ISSN 1678-4685. PMC 9351327. PMID 35925590.
- Sirak, Kendra; Jansen Van Rensburg, Julian; Brielle, Esther; Chen, Bowen; Lazaridis, Iosif; Ringbauer, Harald; Mah, Matthew; Mallick, Swapan; Micco, Adam; Rohland, Nadin; Callan, Kimberly; Curtis, Elizabeth; Kearns, Aisling; Lawson, Ann Marie; Workman, J. Noah (8 February 2024). "Medieval DNA from Soqotra points to Eurasian origins of an isolated population at the crossroads of Africa and Arabia". Nature Ecology & Evolution. 8 (4): 817–829. Bibcode:2024NatEE...8..817S. doi:10.1038/s41559-024-02322-x. ISSN 2397-334X. PMC 11009077. PMID 38332026.
- Siska, Veronika (2 May 2018). Human population history and its interplay with natural selection (Thesis). Apollo-University Of Cambridge Repository, Andrea Manica. doi:10.17863/CAM.31536.
- Skoglund, Pontus; Northoff, Bernd H.; Shunkov, Michael V.; Derevianko, Anatoli P.; Pääbo, Svante; Krause, Johannes; Jakobsson, Mattias (27 January 2014). "Separating endogenous ancient DNA from modern day contamination in a Siberian Neandertal". Proceedings of the National Academy of Sciences. 111 (6): 2229–2234. Bibcode:2014PNAS..111.2229S. doi:10.1073/pnas.1318934111. ISSN 0027-8424. PMC 3926038. PMID 24469802.
- Skoglund, Pontus; Reich, David (2016). "A genomic view of the peopling of the Americas". Current Opinion in Genetics & Development. 41: 27–35. doi:10.1016/j.gde.2016.06.016. PMC 5161672. PMID 27507099.
- Skoglund, Pontus; Mathieson, Iain (31 August 2018). "Ancient Genomics of Modern Humans: The First Decade". Annual Review of Genomics and Human Genetics. 19 (1): 381–404. doi:10.1146/annurev-genom-083117-021749. ISSN 1527-8204. PMID 29709204.
- Skov, Laurits; Peyrégne, Stéphane; Popli, Divyaratan; Iasi, Leonardo N. M.; Devièse, Thibaut; Slon, Viviane; Zavala, Elena I.; Hajdinjak, Mateja; Sümer, Arev P.; Grote, Steffi; Bossoms Mesa, Alba; López Herráez, David; Nickel, Birgit; Nagel, Sarah; Richter, Julia (2022). "Genetic insights into the social organization of Neanderthals". Nature. 610 (7932): 519–525. Bibcode:2022Natur.610..519S. doi:10.1038/s41586-022-05283-y. ISSN 1476-4687. PMC 9581778. PMID 36261548.
- Slimak, Ludovic; Vimala, Tharsika; Seguin-Orlando, Andaine; Metz, Laure; Zanolli, Clément; Joannes-Boyau, Renaud; Frouin, Marine; Arnold, Lee J.; Demuro, Martina; Devièse, Thibaut; Comeskey, Daniel; Buckley, Michael; Camus, Hubert; Muth, Xavier; Lewis, Jason E. (2024). "Long genetic and social isolation in Neanderthals before their extinction". Cell Genomics. 4 (9) 100593. doi:10.1016/j.xgen.2024.100593. PMC 11480857. PMID 39265525.
- Slon, Viviane; Viola, Bence; Renaud, Gabriel; Gansauge, Marie-Theres; Benazzi, Stefano; Sawyer, Susanna; Hublin, Jean-Jacques; Shunkov, Michael V.; Derevianko, Anatoly P.; Kelso, Janet; Prüfer, Kay; Meyer, Matthias; Pääbo, Svante (7 July 2017). "A fourth Denisovan individual". Science Advances. 3 (7) e1700186. Bibcode:2017SciA....3E0186S. doi:10.1126/sciadv.1700186. PMC 5501502. PMID 28695206.
- Slon, Viviane; Mafessoni, Fabrizio; Vernot, Benjamin; de Filippo, Cesare; Grote, Steffi; Viola, Bence; Hajdinjak, Mateja; Peyrégne, Stéphane; Nagel, Sarah; Brown, Samantha; Douka, Katerina; Higham, Tom; Kozlikin, Maxim B.; Shunkov, Michael V.; Derevianko, Anatoly P. (2018). "The genome of the offspring of a Neanderthal mother and a Denisovan father". Nature. 561 (7721): 113–116. Bibcode:2018Natur.561..113S. doi:10.1038/s41586-018-0455-x. ISSN 0028-0836. PMC 6130845. PMID 30135579.
- Smith, Fred H.; Ahern, James C. M., eds. (2013). The origins of modern humans: biology reconsidered. Hoboken, New Jersey: Wiley-Blackwell. ISBN 978-0-470-89409-5.
- Speidel, Leo; Cassidy, Lara; Davies, Robert W; Hellenthal, Garrett; Skoglund, Pontus; Myers, Simon R (23 August 2021). Harris, Kelley (ed.). "Inferring Population Histories for Ancient Genomes Using Genome-Wide Genealogies". Molecular Biology and Evolution. 38 (9): 3497–3511. doi:10.1093/molbev/msab174. ISSN 1537-1719. PMC 8383901. PMID 34129037.
- Sümer, Arev P.; Rougier, Hélène; Villalba-Mouco, Vanessa; Huang, Yilei; Iasi, Leonardo N. M.; Essel, Elena; Mesa, Alba Bossoms; Furtwaengler, Anja; Peyrégne, Stéphane; de Filippo, Cesare; Rohrlach, Adam B.; Pierini, Federica; Mafessoni, Fabrizio; Fewlass, Helen; Zavala, Elena I. (12 December 2024). "Earliest modern human genomes constrain timing of Neanderthal admixture". Nature. 638 (8051): 711–717. doi:10.1038/s41586-024-08420-x. ISSN 1476-4687. PMC 11839475. PMID 39667410.
- Svensson, Emma; Günther, Torsten; Hoischen, Alexander; Hervella, Montserrat; Munters, Arielle R.; Ioana, Mihai; Ridiche, Florin; Edlund, Hanna; Deuren, Rosanne C. van; Soficaru, Andrei; de-la-Rua, Concepción; Netea, Mihai G.; Jakobsson, Mattias (26 July 2021). "Genome of Peştera Muierii skull shows high diversity and low mutational load in pre-glacial Europe". Current Biology. 31 (14): 2973–2983.e9. Bibcode:2021CBio...31E2973S. doi:10.1016/j.cub.2021.04.045. ISSN 0960-9822. PMID 34010592.
- Tiesler, Vera (9 May 2022). The Routledge Handbook of Mesoamerican Bioarchaeology (1 ed.). London: Routledge. doi:10.4324/9780429341618. ISBN 978-0-429-34161-8.
- Tobler, Raymond; Souilmi, Yassine; Huber, Christian D.; Bean, Nigel; Turney, Chris S. M.; Grey, Shane T.; Cooper, Alan (30 May 2023). "The role of genetic selection and climatic factors in the dispersal of anatomically modern humans out of Africa". Proceedings of the National Academy of Sciences. 120 (22) e2213061120. Bibcode:2023PNAS..12013061T. doi:10.1073/pnas.2213061120. PMC 10235988. PMID 37220274.
- Vallini, Leonardo; Marciani, Giulia; Aneli, Serena; Bortolini, Eugenio; Benazzi, Stefano; Pievani, Telmo; Pagani, Luca (10 April 2022). Huerta-Sanchez, Emilia (ed.). "Genetics and Material Culture Support Repeated Expansions into Paleolithic Eurasia from a Population Hub Out of Africa". Genome Biology and Evolution. 14 (4) evac045. doi:10.1093/gbe/evac045. ISSN 1759-6653. PMC 9021735. PMID 35445261.
- Vallini, Leonardo; Pagani, Luca (2022). "The future of the Eurasian past: highlighting plotholes and pillars of human population movements in the Late Pleistocene". Journal of Anthropological Sciences. 100 (100): 231–241. doi:10.4436/JASS.10013. ISSN 1827-4765. PMID 36565457.
- Vallini, Leonardo; Zampieri, Carlo; Shoaee, Mohamed Javad; Bortolini, Eugenio; Marciani, Giulia; Aneli, Serena; Pievani, Telmo; Benazzi, Stefano; Barausse, Alberto; Mezzavilla, Massimo; Petraglia, Michael D.; Pagani, Luca (25 March 2024). "The Persian plateau served as hub for Homo sapiens after the main out of Africa dispersal". Nature Communications. 15 (1) 1882. Bibcode:2024NatCo..15.1882V. doi:10.1038/s41467-024-46161-7. ISSN 2041-1723. PMC 10963722. PMID 38528002.
- van de Loosdrecht, Marieke; Bouzouggar, Abdeljalil; Humphrey, Louise; Posth, Cosimo; Barton, Nick; Aximu-Petri, Ayinuer; Nickel, Birgit; Nagel, Sarah; Talbi, El Hassan; El Hajraoui, Mohammed Abdeljalil; Amzazi, Saaïd; Hublin, Jean-Jacques; Pääbo, Svante; Schiffels, Stephan; Meyer, Matthias (4 May 2018). "Pleistocene North African genomes link Near Eastern and sub-Saharan African human populations". Science. 360 (6388): 548–552. Bibcode:2018Sci...360..548V. doi:10.1126/science.aar8380. ISSN 0036-8075. PMID 29545507.
- Vernot, Benjamin; Zavala, Elena I.; Gómez-Olivencia, Asier; Jacobs, Zenobia; Slon, Viviane; Mafessoni, Fabrizio; Romagné, Frédéric; Pearson, Alice; Petr, Martin; Sala, Nohemi; Pablos, Adrián; Aranburu, Arantza; de Castro, José María Bermúdez; Carbonell, Eudald; Li, Bo (7 May 2021). "Unearthing Neanderthal population history using nuclear and mitochondrial DNA from cave sediments". Science. 372 (6542) eabf1667. Bibcode:2021Sci...372f1667V. doi:10.1126/science.abf1667. ISSN 0036-8075. PMID 33858989.
- Villalba-Mouco, Vanessa; Loosdrecht, Marieke S. van de; Posth, Cosimo; Mora, Rafael; Martínez-Moreno, Jorge; Rojo-Guerra, Manuel; Salazar-García, Domingo C.; Royo-Guillén, José I.; Kunst, Michael; Rougier, Hélène; Crevecoeur, Isabelle; Arcusa-Magallón, Héctor; Tejedor-Rodríguez, Cristina; Lagrán, Iñigo García-Martínez de; Garrido-Pena, Rafael (1 April 2019). "Survival of Late Pleistocene Hunter-Gatherer Ancestry in the Iberian Peninsula". Current Biology. 29 (7): 1169–1177.e7. doi:10.1016/j.cub.2019.02.006. ISSN 0960-9822. PMID 30880015.
- Villalba-Mouco, Vanessa; van de Loosdrecht, Marieke S.; Rohrlach, Adam B.; Fewlass, Helen; Talamo, Sahra; Yu, He; Aron, Franziska; Lalueza-Fox, Carles; Cabello, Lidia; Cantalejo Duarte, Pedro; Ramos-Muñoz, José; Posth, Cosimo; Krause, Johannes; Weniger, Gerd-Christian; Haak, Wolfgang (1 March 2023). "A 23,000-year-old southern Iberian individual links human groups that lived in Western Europe before and after the Last Glacial Maximum". Nature Ecology & Evolution. 7 (4): 597–609. Bibcode:2023NatEE...7..597V. doi:10.1038/s41559-023-01987-0. ISSN 2397-334X. PMC 10089921. PMID 36859553.
- Wang, Tianyi; Wang, Wei; Xie, Guangmao; Li, Zhen; Fan, Xuechun; Yang, Qingping; Wu, Xichao; Cao, Peng; Liu, Yichen; Yang, Ruowei; Liu, Feng; Dai, Qingyan; Feng, Xiaotian; Wu, Xiaohong; Qin, Ling (8 July 2021). "Human population history at the crossroads of East and Southeast Asia since 11,000 years ago". Cell. 184 (14): 3829–3841.e21. Bibcode:2021Cell..184.3829W. doi:10.1016/j.cell.2021.05.018. ISSN 0092-8674. PMID 34171307.
- Wang, Ke; Yu, He; Radzevičiūtė, Rita; Kiryushin, Yuriy F.; Tishkin, Alexey A.; Frolov, Yaroslav V.; Stepanova, Nadezhda F.; Kiryushin, Kirill Yu.; Kungurov, Artur L.; Shnaider, Svetlana V.; Tur, Svetlana S.; Tiunov, Mikhail P.; Zubova, Alisa V.; Pevzner, Maria; Karimov, Timur (2023). "Middle Holocene Siberian genomes reveal highly connected gene pools throughout North Asia". Current Biology. 33 (3): 423–433.e5. Bibcode:2023CBio...33E.423W. doi:10.1016/j.cub.2022.11.062. PMID 36638796.
- Wang, Tianyi; Yang, Melinda A.; Zhu, Zhonghua; Ma, Minmin; Shi, Han; Speidel, Leo; Min, Rui; Yuan, Haibing; Jiang, Zhilong; Hu, Changcheng; Li, Xiaorui; Zhao, Dongyue; Bai, Fan; Cao, Peng; Liu, Feng (29 May 2025). "Prehistoric genomes from Yunnan reveal ancestry related to Tibetans and Austroasiatic speakers". Science. 388 (6750) eadq9792. Bibcode:2025Sci...388q9792W. doi:10.1126/science.adq9792. ISSN 0036-8075. PMID 40440384.
- Whittle, Alasdair; Pollard, Joshua; Greaney, Susan, eds. (2023). Ancient DNA and the European Neolithic: relations and descent (Paperback ed.). Philadelphia: Oxbow Books. ISBN 978-1-78925-910-0.
- Willerslev, Eske; Meltzer, David J. (2021). "Peopling of the Americas as inferred from ancient genomics". Nature. 594 (7863): 356–364. Bibcode:2021Natur.594..356W. doi:10.1038/s41586-021-03499-y. ISSN 1476-4687. PMID 34135521.
- Wong, Emily H. M.; Khrunin, Andrey; Nichols, Larissa; Pushkarev, Dmitry; Khokhrin, Denis; Verbenko, Dmitry; Evgrafov, Oleg; Knowles, James; Novembre, John; Limborska, Svetlana; Valouev, Anton (1 January 2017). "Reconstructing genetic history of Siberian and Northeastern European populations". Genome Research. 27 (1): 1–14. doi:10.1101/gr.202945.115. ISSN 1088-9051. PMC 5204334. PMID 27965293.
- Yang, Melinda A.; Gao, Xing; Theunert, Christoph; Tong, Haowen; Aximu-Petri, Ayinuer; Nickel, Birgit; Slatkin, Montgomery; Meyer, Matthias; Pääbo, Svante; Kelso, Janet; Fu, Qiaomei (2017). "40,000-Year-Old Individual from Asia Provides Insight into Early Population Structure in Eurasia". Current Biology. 27 (20): 3202–3208.e9. Bibcode:2017CBio...27E3202Y. doi:10.1016/j.cub.2017.09.030. PMC 6592271. PMID 29033327.
- Yang, Melinda A. (6 January 2022). "A genetic history of migration, diversification, and admixture in Asia". Human Population Genetics and Genomics. 2 (1) 0001: 1–32. doi:10.47248/hpgg2202010001. ISSN 2770-5005.
- Yang, Melinda A.; Fu, Qiaomei (2018). "Insights into Modern Human Prehistory Using Ancient Genomes". Trends in Genetics. 34 (3): 184–196. doi:10.1016/j.tig.2017.11.008. PMID 29395378.
- Yu, He; Spyrou, Maria A.; Karapetian, Marina; Shnaider, Svetlana; Radzevičiūtė, Rita; Nägele, Kathrin; Neumann, Gunnar U.; Penske, Sandra; Zech, Jana; Lucas, Mary; LeRoux, Petrus; Roberts, Patrick; Pavlenok, Galina; Buzhilova, Alexandra; Posth, Cosimo (2020). "Paleolithic to Bronze Age Siberians Reveal Connections with First Americans and across Eurasia". Cell. 181 (6): 1232–1245.e20. doi:10.1016/j.cell.2020.04.037. PMID 32437661.
- Zavala, Elena I.; Jacobs, Zenobia; Vernot, Benjamin; Shunkov, Michael V.; Kozlikin, Maxim B.; Derevianko, Anatoly P.; Essel, Elena; de Fillipo, Cesare; Nagel, Sarah; Richter, Julia; Romagné, Frédéric; Schmidt, Anna; Li, Bo; O'Gorman, Kieran; Slon, Viviane (2021). "Pleistocene sediment DNA reveals hominin and faunal turnovers at Denisova Cave". Nature. 595 (7867): 399–403. Bibcode:2021Natur.595..399Z. doi:10.1038/s41586-021-03675-0. ISSN 1476-4687. PMC 8277575. PMID 34163072.
- Zhang, Ming; Fu, Qiaomei (1 June 2020). "Human evolutionary history in Eastern Eurasia using insights from ancient DNA". Current Opinion in Genetics & Development. Genetics of Human Origin. 62: 78–84. doi:10.1016/j.gde.2020.06.009. ISSN 0959-437X. PMID 32688244.
- Zhang, Xiaoming; Ji, Xueping; Li, Chunmei; Yang, Tingyu; Huang, Jiahui; Zhao, Yinhui; Wu, Yun; Ma, Shiwu; Pang, Yuhong; Huang, Yanyi; He, Yaoxi; Su, Bing (25 July 2022). "A Late Pleistocene human genome from Southwest China". Current Biology. 32 (14): 3095–3109.e5. Bibcode:2022CBio...32.3095Z. doi:10.1016/j.cub.2022.06.016. ISSN 0960-9822. PMID 35839766.
- Zhang, Ming (2023). "Ancient genomes reveal the complex genetic history of Prehistoric Eurasian modern humans". Acta Anthropologica Sinica. 42 (3): 412–422.
