= Edoardo Borzatti von Löwenstern =

Italian archaeologist, university teacher (1935–2026)

- Born: January 1, 1935; Zara, Italy (now Croatia)
- Died: April 17, 2026 (aged 91); Florence, Italy
- Known for: Excavations at Porto Selvaggio and Atella; Identification of the Uluzzian culture Rock-art surveys in Wadi Rum
- Scientific career
- Fields: Archaeology; Prehistoric ecology Rock art
- Workplaces: University of Florence

Edoardo Borzatti von Löwenstern (1935 – 17 April 2026) was an Italian archaeologist and paleontologist, professor of human paleontology at the University of Florence. He directed long-term excavations of Paleolithic sites in southern Italy and led an Italian scientific mission in the Wadi Rum desert of Jordan for several decades, where he documented thousands of petroglyphs and inscriptions.

== Early life and career ==
Borzatti von Löwenstern was born in 1935 in Zara, then part of the Kingdom of Italy and now in Croatia, and was an exile from Dalmatia. He began his academic career at the University of Florence in the 1960s, where he later taught prehistoric ecology and human paleontology. From 1979, he was the editor of the journal Studi per l'Ecologia del Quaternario.

== Research ==
=== Porto Selvaggio and the Uluzzian ===
Beginning in 1961, Borzatti von Löwenstern conducted excavations along the Salento coast in southern Apulia, working alongside Arturo Palma di Cesnola of the University of Siena. The two researchers excavated several caves in the Bay of Uluzzo and the wider Porto Selvaggio area, including Grotta del Cavallo, Capelvenere, Torre dell'Alto, Uluzzo C, Grotta Mario Bernardini, Serra Cicora A and the cave later named Grotta Borzatti. The work led to the identification and documentation of the Uluzzian, a transitional Middle-to-Upper Paleolithic lithic industry named after the bay. A chronological model of human settlement in the Italian Peninsula developed jointly by Palma di Cesnola and Borzatti von Löwenstern remained a reference for Neanderthal occupation studies in the region for decades.

=== Cimitero di Atella ===
From the early 1990s, Borzatti von Löwenstern directed the excavation of the Lower Paleolithic open-air site of Cimitero di Atella, located in Basilicata about 10 km south of the Monte Vulture volcano. The excavation continued for nearly twenty years and revealed a 5-metre-thick fluvio-lacustrine sequence containing two main archaeological units with lithic industries and faunal remains. On the basis of the assemblages, and in particular the presence of handaxes in the lower unit, he attributed the site to the Early Acheulean and interpreted it as a series of lake-shore occupations linked to the exploitation of large mammals such as Palaeoloxodon antiquus and Bison sp. The town of Atella made him an honorary citizen.

=== Wadi Rum ===
After several years of paleontological and archaeological field campaigns in different parts of the world, in 1974 Borzatti von Löwenstern began focusing on the Wadi Rum desert in southern Jordan. From 1978, he led a long-running University of Florence mission in the area, which surveyed the Hishma basin and the surrounding sandstone uplands and established a permanent research base near the site. Over four decades, the team collected and analysed thousands of objects, including stone tools, Chalcolithic anthropomorphic figurines and petroglyphs depicting humans, animals, hunting scenes and daily life. He proposed a thematic typology of the Wadi Rum rock art that distinguished hunting scenes, collective fights and duels, scenes with domesticated animals, dance and ritual scenes, erotic and parturition scenes, depictions of feet and hands, and abstract motifs and tribal marks. He dated the earliest pictographs in the area to between 7000 and 3000 BC.

In 1985, he reported the discovery of petroglyphs representing what he interpreted as an ancient map of Jordan. He later identified, in roughly 3,000 km^{2} of desert, some 240 sites bearing more than 1,600 ideograms, which he argued formed a writing system pre-dating the Thamudic script and possibly among the earliest known. The interpretation was considered stimulating but contested by some specialists, who questioned both the early dating and the identification of the symbols as a true alphabet. The Jordanian government later offered him the cultural direction of the planned Disi archaeological museum, built within the protected area with World Bank funding.

== Selected publications ==
- Wadi Rum (Longanesi, Milan 1977)
- I Tuareg: un mondo che scompare (Paravia, Turin 1978)
- Quando il Sahara era verde (Paravia, Turin 1982)
- L'altra umanità (Sansoni, Florence 1983)
- Quadri di pietra – 8000 anni d'arte nel deserto (Nuova S1, Bologna 2005)
