= Zlatý kůň woman =

Human fossil found in Czechia

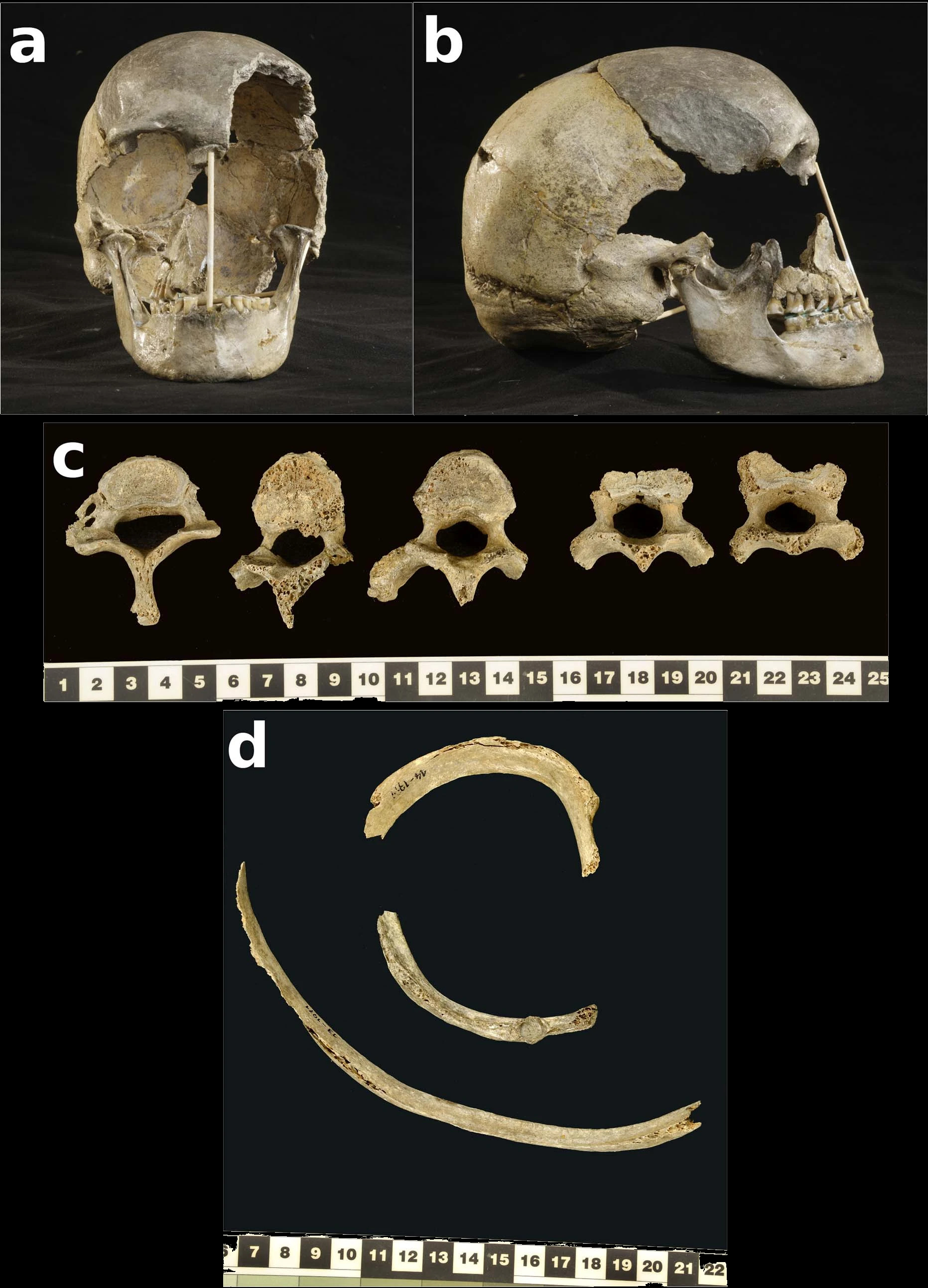
- Skeletal remains
- Common name: Zlatý kůň woman
- Species: Human
- Age: c. 45,000 years
- Place discovered: Koněprusy, Central Bohemia, Czechia
- Date discovered: 1950

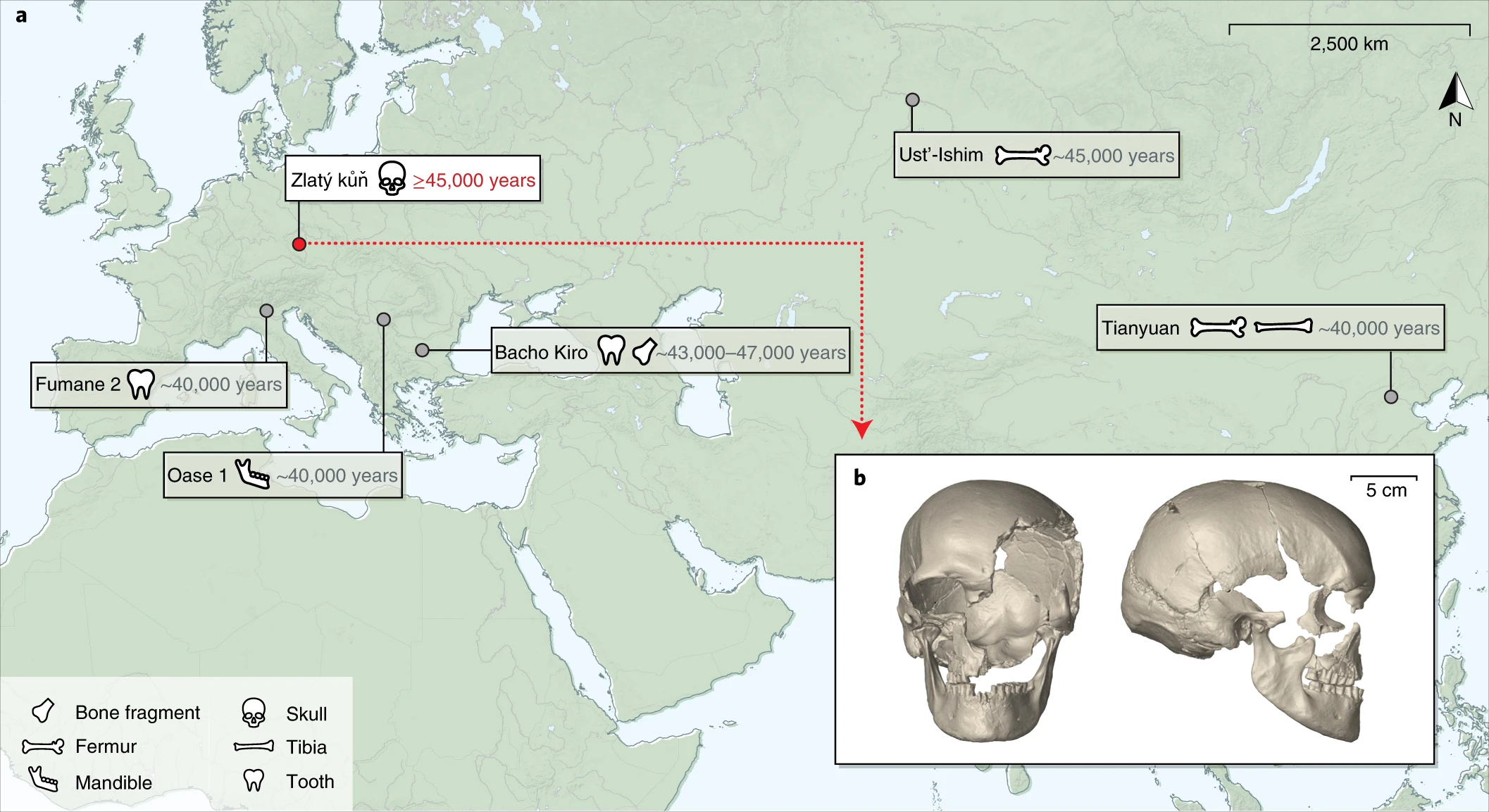
Location of the Zlatý kůň fossil, with an age of at least ~43,000 years, which has yielded genome-wide data.

The Zlatý kůň woman is the partial skeleton of an ancient Early European modern human woman, dated to around 45,000 years ago. She was discovered in the Koněprusy Caves in the Czech Republic in 1950.

The Zlatý kůň woman was found associated with stone and bone tools attributed to the Initial Upper Paleolithic (IUP), but they could not be attributed to any specific archaeological culture or technocomplex. The IUP represents the earliest modern human cultures in Europe, which expanded into Eurasia more than 45,000 years ago, following humanity's dispersal out of Africa. Genetic evidence indicates that the Zlatý kůň woman belonged to the same population as humans in the IUP layers at Ilsenhöhle cave, Ranis, Thuringia, Germany, 230 kilometres (140 mi) away from Koněprusy, who are associated with the Lincombian-Ranisian-Jerzmanowician technocomplex. The Zlatý kůň woman was a relative (familial relationship of a fifth- or sixth-degree) of two of the individuals found at Ilsenhöhle, with the Zlatý kůň woman and the Ilsenhöhle individuals probably only living three generations apart, confidently constraining the age of the skull (which has otherwise been impossible to confidently radiocarbon date because of its contamination with modern animal-based adhesives used to conserve it) to approximately 45,000 years ago, based on the radiocarbon dating of the Ilsenhöhle individuals.

The Zlatý kůň individual is one of the oldest anatomically modern humans to be successfully genetically sequenced. Her mtDNA haplogroup is part of a basal branch of N and is most closely related to paleolithic remains from Bacho Kiro cave (Bulgaria) and Salkhit (Mongolia) and, more distantly, to later remains from Chukchi Peninsula (modern far eastern Russia) and indigenous Australians. Genetic analysis of the nuclear genome indicates that the Zlatý kůň woman, along with the individuals found at Ilsenhöhle, belong to an early diverging group of the Out-of-Africa population that broke away before the split between the ancestors of modern Europeans and East Asians and was not ancestral to later groups of European Palaeolithic hunter-gatherers or to living human groups, and also separate and unrelated to another similarly aged group of IUP European hunter-gatherers represented by a 40,000 year old skeleton from Oase, Romania (Oase 1), and several 44,000 year old individuals from Bacho Kiro Cave, who were more closely related to though outside the ancestry of modern non-Africans.

The early Out-of-Africa population mated with Neanderthals in the period between 45,000 and 60,000 years ago, likely during the initial phase of their expansion into the Middle East, and they carried ~2–9% Neanderthal ancestry in their genomes. It has also been proposed that early modern humans coexisted with Neanderthals in Europe for a period of about 3,000–5,000 years. The Zlatý kůň woman had a small amount of Neanderthal admixture, going back 70 or 80 generations, which the same Neanderthal ancestry shared with all non-African modern humans, with no evidence of additional later Neanderthal ancestry as is found in the Oase and Bacho Kiro IUP individuals.

Other early modern humans that have been directly dated to this period include:

- a 45,000-year-old Ust'-Ishim man (no continuity with later Eurasians);
- a 40,000-year-old Tianyuan man, who is more closely related to modern Asians and Native Americans;
- Fumane 2, c. 40,000 BP.

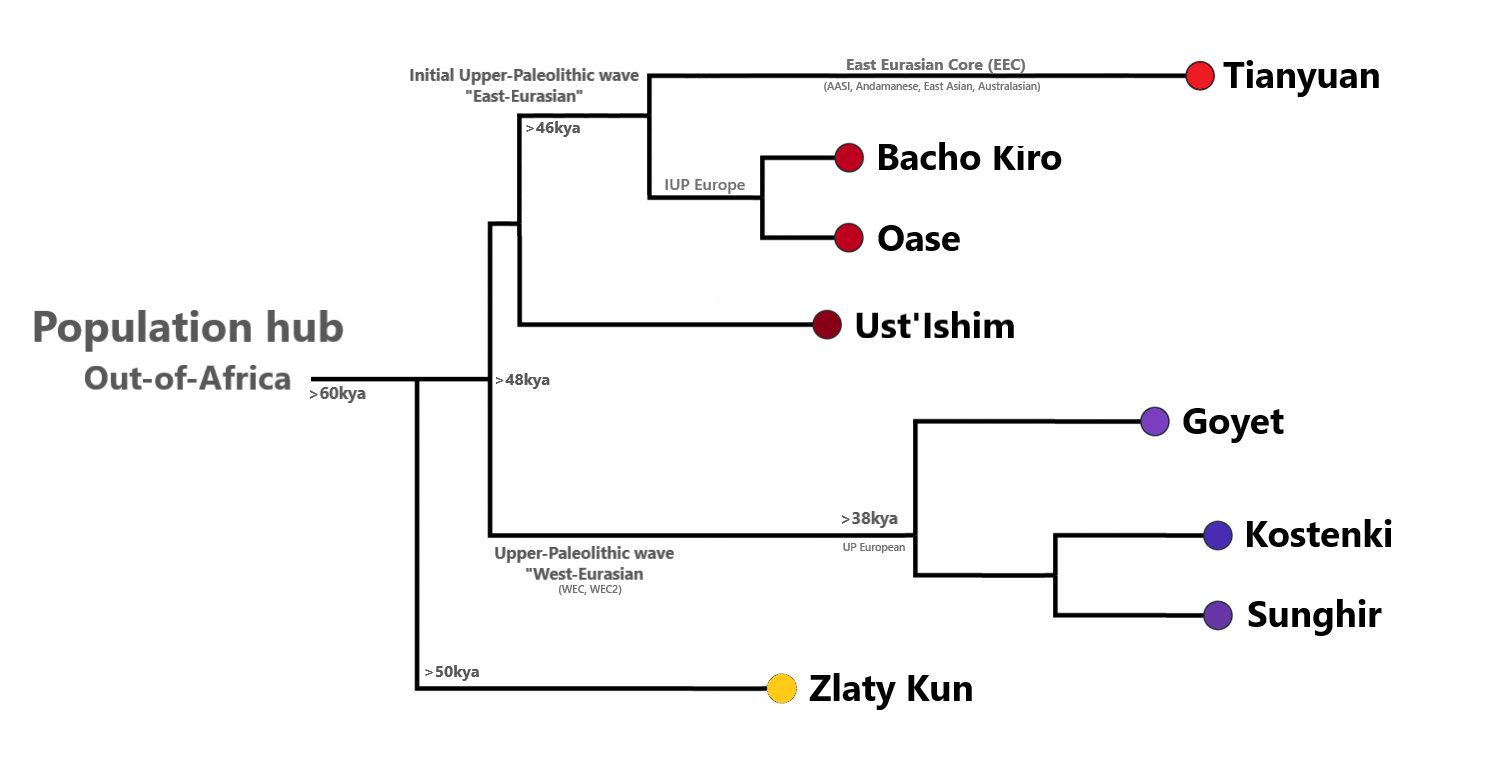
Phylogenetic position of ancient Upper Paleolithic Eurasian specimens.
