= Marco Peresani =

Italian prehistoric archaeologist

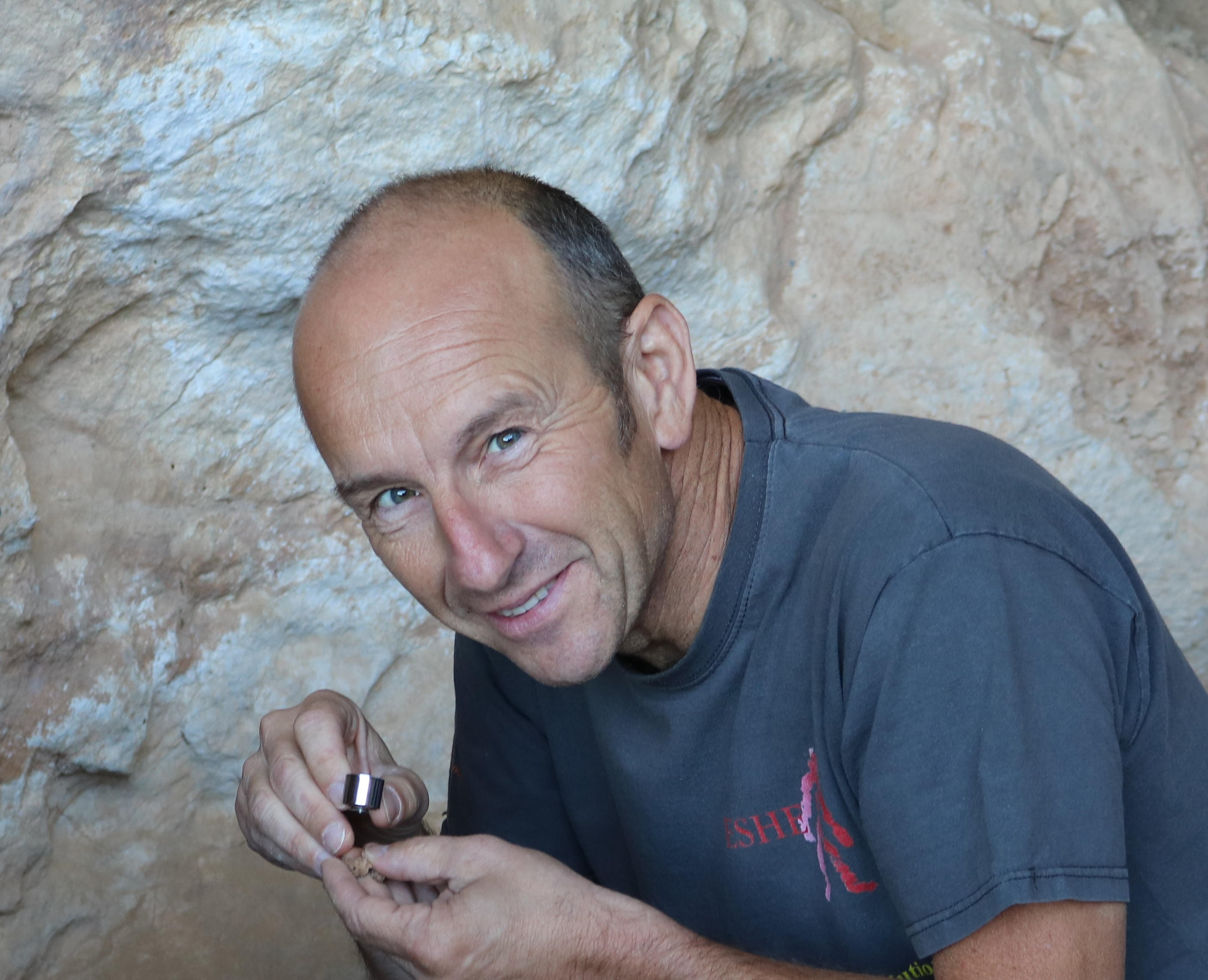
Marco Peresani

Marco Peresani (born 2 November 1963 in Udine) is an Italian prehistoric archaeologist, anthropologist, university professor and scientific communicator.

== Career ==
His training and expertise bridges the Natural Sciences and the Humanities. After completing is PhD in 1993 at the university of Ferrara, under the mentorship of Prof. Alberto Broglio and Prof. Mauro Cremaschi, he took on research and teaching positions in the same institution. Since 2022, he is Full Professor at Department of Humanities of the university of Ferrara.

== Research ==
His research has focused on the Middle Palaeolithic (300-40 ka BP- Neanderthal Man), the arrival of Homo sapiens and the subsequent disappearance of the Neanderthal (45-40 ka BP- Transition between Middle and Upper Palaeolithic) and the peopling of the Adriatic area during the phases before and after the Last Glacial Maximum. He has particularly dedicated himself to the N-E Italian area, but his collaborations and consultancies have led him to expand his range of action to the N-W Apennines (Piovesello site) and Liguria (Arma Veirana site) and archaeological research on both sides of the mid-Adriatic (Marche and Albania). Thanks to these studies of considerable importance, it boasts numerous collaborations with research institutes on international projects. The wealth of his research is represented by the various sites investigated over the years: Grotta de Nadale (Berici, Quina Mousterian), Riparo and Grotta del Broion (Berici, Uluzzian and final Mousterian), Riparo Villabruna (Epigravettian burial) Grotta del Rio Secco (PN, specialised hunting of cave bears by Neanderthals), Grotta del Clusantin (specialised hunting of marmots in the Late Glacial period). A site representing the synthesis of his research is Grotta di Fumane (VR).

== Fumane ==
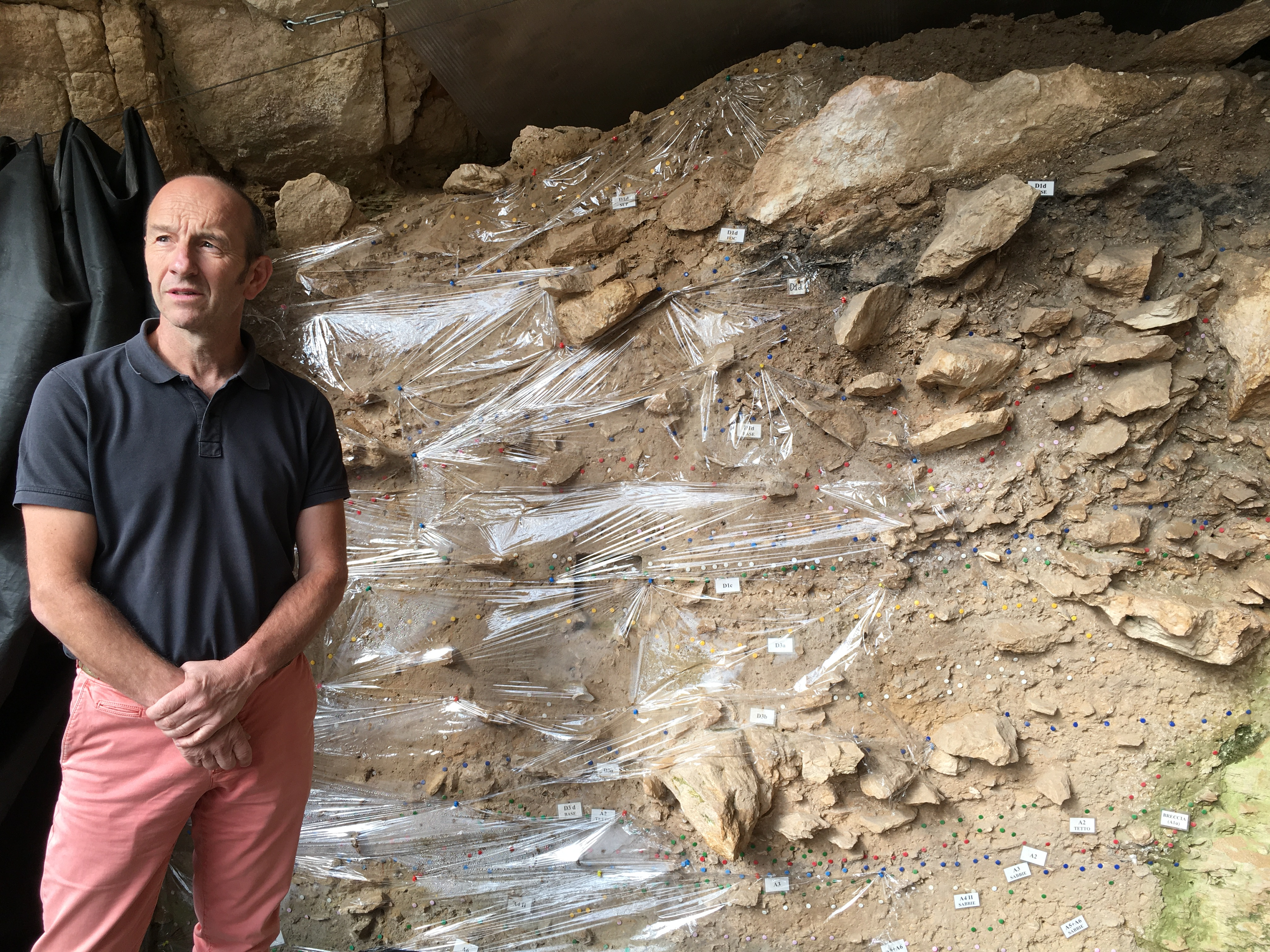
Marco Peresani showing the Upper Palaeolithic section of the Fumane stratigraphical sequence

Research at Grotta di Fumane represents his biggest endeavour. He assisted Prof. A. Broglio and M. Cremaschi from the start of the excavation and took the lead in 2006. The impressive stratigraphic archive (ca. 80-30 ka BP) and the good conditions of preservation make it a key site for understanding the adaptive and cultural dynamics first of Neanderthals and then of the early Sapiens. Among the numerous discoveries, the most important are:

- the Aurignacian painted stones (ca. 35 ka BP), including the Shaman, can be traced back to the use of the cave by the early Homo sapiens.
- the Uluzzian, a culture that is completely alien to both the preceding and following contexts, and which signals the arrival of the first Homo sapiens in the Italian peninsula.
- Non-utilitarian behaviours of the last Neanderthals like exploitation of birds' feathers and talons, fossil shell as a pendant, and green serpentinite pebbles.

== Bibliography ==
He is the author and co-author of more than 330 scientific articles and editor of more than ten volumes.

== Most significant articles and books ==
- Peresani M., Monegato G., Ravazzi C., Bertola S., Margaritora D., Breda M., Fontana A., Fontana F., Janković I., Karavanic I., Komšo D., Mozzi P., Pini R., Furlanetto G., Giovanni Maria De Amicis M., Perhoč Z., Posth C., Ronchi L., Rossato S., Vukosavljević N., Zerboni A., 2021. Hunter-gatherers across the Great Adriatic-Po Region during the Last Glacial Maximum: environmental and cultural dynamics. Quaternary International, special issue LGM in Europe, 581–582, pp. 128–163. https://doi.org/10.1016/j.quaint.2020.10.007
- Peresani M., Bertola S., Delpiano D., Benazzi S., Romandini M., 2019. The Uluzzian in the north of Italy. Insights around the new evidence at Riparo Broion Rockshelter. Archaeological and Anthropological Sciences, 11(7), pp. 3503–3536. https://doi.org/10.1007/s12520-018-0770-z
- Peresani M., Vanhaeren M., Quaggiotto E., Queffelec A., d'Errico F., 2013, An ochered fossil marine shell from the Mousterian of Fumane Cave, Italy. PLosOne, 8(7), e68572. https://doi.org/10.1371/journal.pone.0068572
- Peresani M., Fiore I., Gala M., Romandini M., Tagliacozzo A., 2011, Late Neandertals and the intentional removal of feathers as evidenced from bird bone taphonomy at Fumane cave 44ky BP, Italy. Proceedings National Academy of Sciences of the United States of America, 108, pp. 3888–3893. https://doi.org/10.1073/pnas.1016212108
- Peresani, Marco, ed. (2003). Discoid lithic technology: advances and implications. Oxford: Archaeopress. ISBN 1-84171-496-8. OCLC 52865761.

== Membership in scientific associations ==
He is an active member of the most important Italian and international Associations and Academies of the sector: Italian Institute of Prehistory and Protohistory, Association of Italian Anthropologists, Hugo Obermaier Gesellschaft, European Society for the Study of Human Evolution, VIII Commission of the International Union of Prehistoric and Protohistoric Sciences, Italian Quaternary Association (Presidency Council member), and Accademia Olimpica of Vicenza
