= Lincombian-Ranisian-Jerzmanowician =

Upper Paleolithic blade-making culture

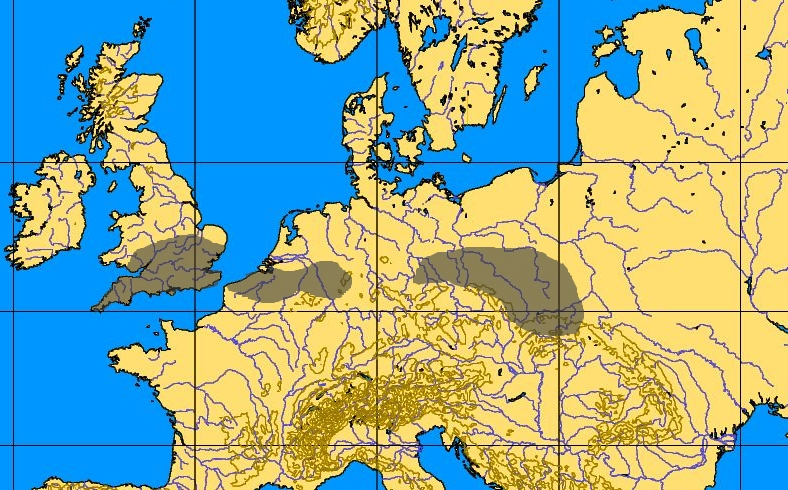
- Geographical range: Northwest Europe
- Period: Upper Paleolithic
- Dates: c. 45,000 years BP

Lincombian-Ranisian-Jerzmanowician (LRJ) is a European Upper Palaeolithic culture or technocomplex (industry) dating to the Initial Upper Palaeolithic, about 45,000 years ago. It is characterised by leaf points made on long blades, which were traditionally thought to have been made by the last Neanderthals, although more recently it has been recognised as having been produced by among the first anatomically modern humans in Europe. It is rarely found, but extends across northwest Europe from Wales to Poland.

== Chronology, major sites and distribution ==
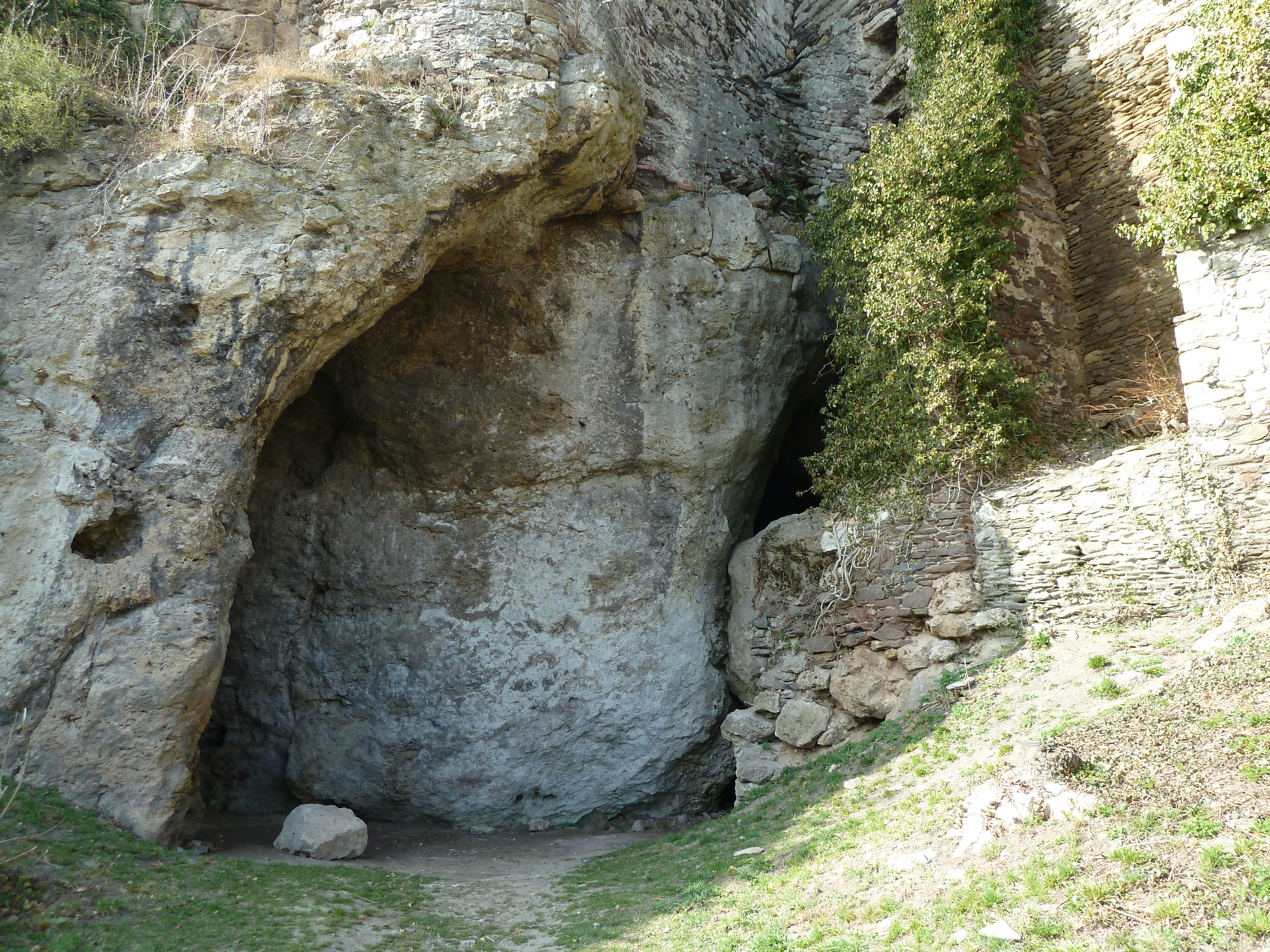
Entrance to Ilsenhöhle cave in Ranis in Thuringia, a key LRJ site

The technocomplex is named after findings in Kents Cavern, which is situated on Lincombe Hill, Torquay (Devon, England), the cave of Ilsenhöhle in Ranis (Thuringia, Germany), and Nietopierzowa cave in Jerzmanowice (Kraków County, Poland). About 40 different sites have been identified. Other sites in Britain in addition to Kent's Cavern includes, among others, Robin Hood Cave and Pinhole Cave in the Creswell Crags, Derbyshire, the Hyena Den at Wookey Hole, Somerset, Paviland Cave, Wales, Beedings, Sussex, and Grange Farm, Rutland. Sites in Belgium include the Goyet Caves and Spy Cave. The LRJ complex may have emerged from the Bohunician complex. A 2023 study argued that the LRJ complex spanned the period 42-40,000 years ago, but radiocarbon dating of Ranis has suggested the culture began earlier, around 45-47,000 years ago.

== Description ==
A distinctive feature of the LRJ complex is blades with "leaf points", which are unifacially (one-side) or bifacially (both-sides) worked, which are thought to have been used as spear heads.

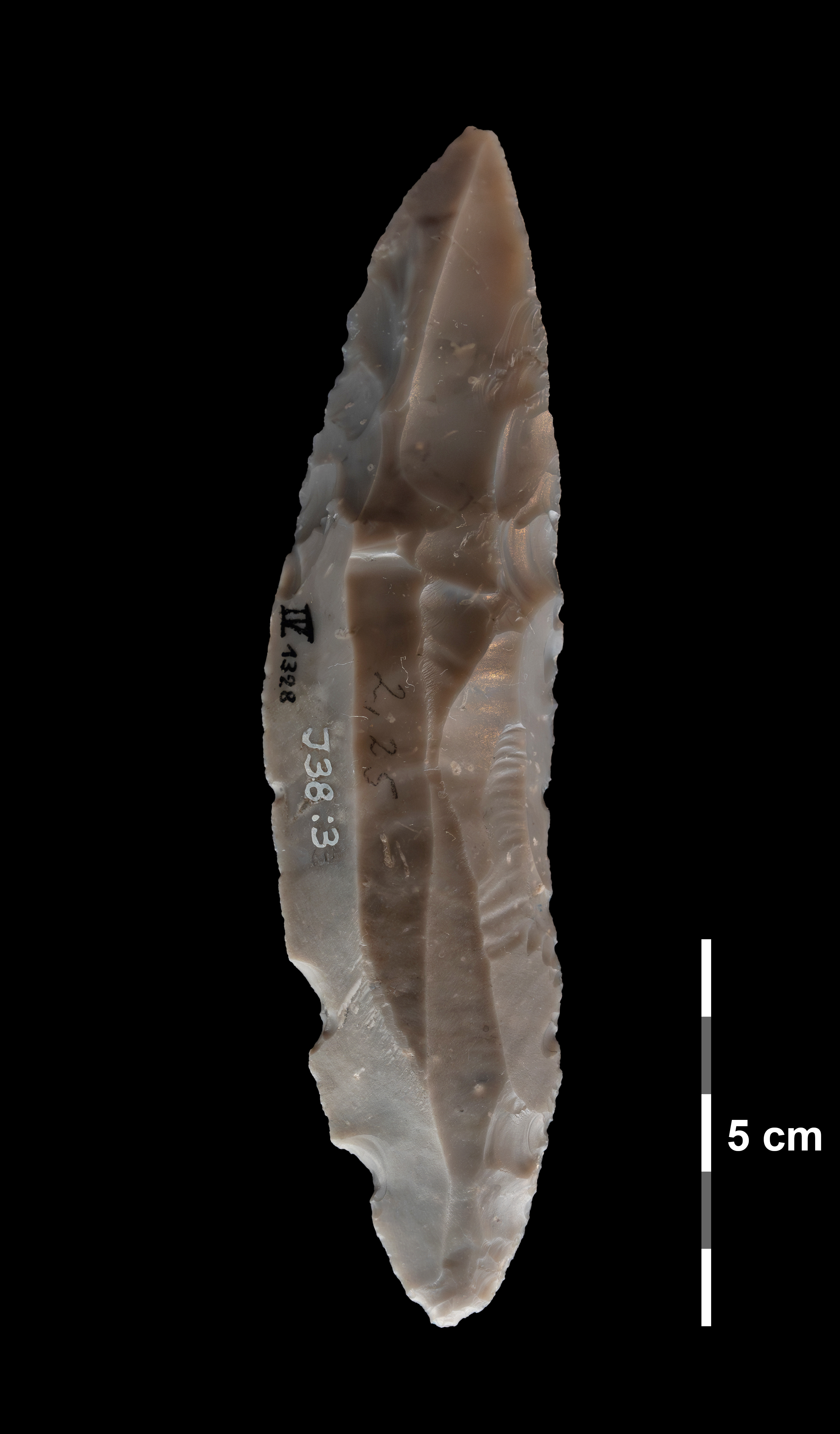
Example of a LRJ-type blade point from Ranis, Thuringia, Germany

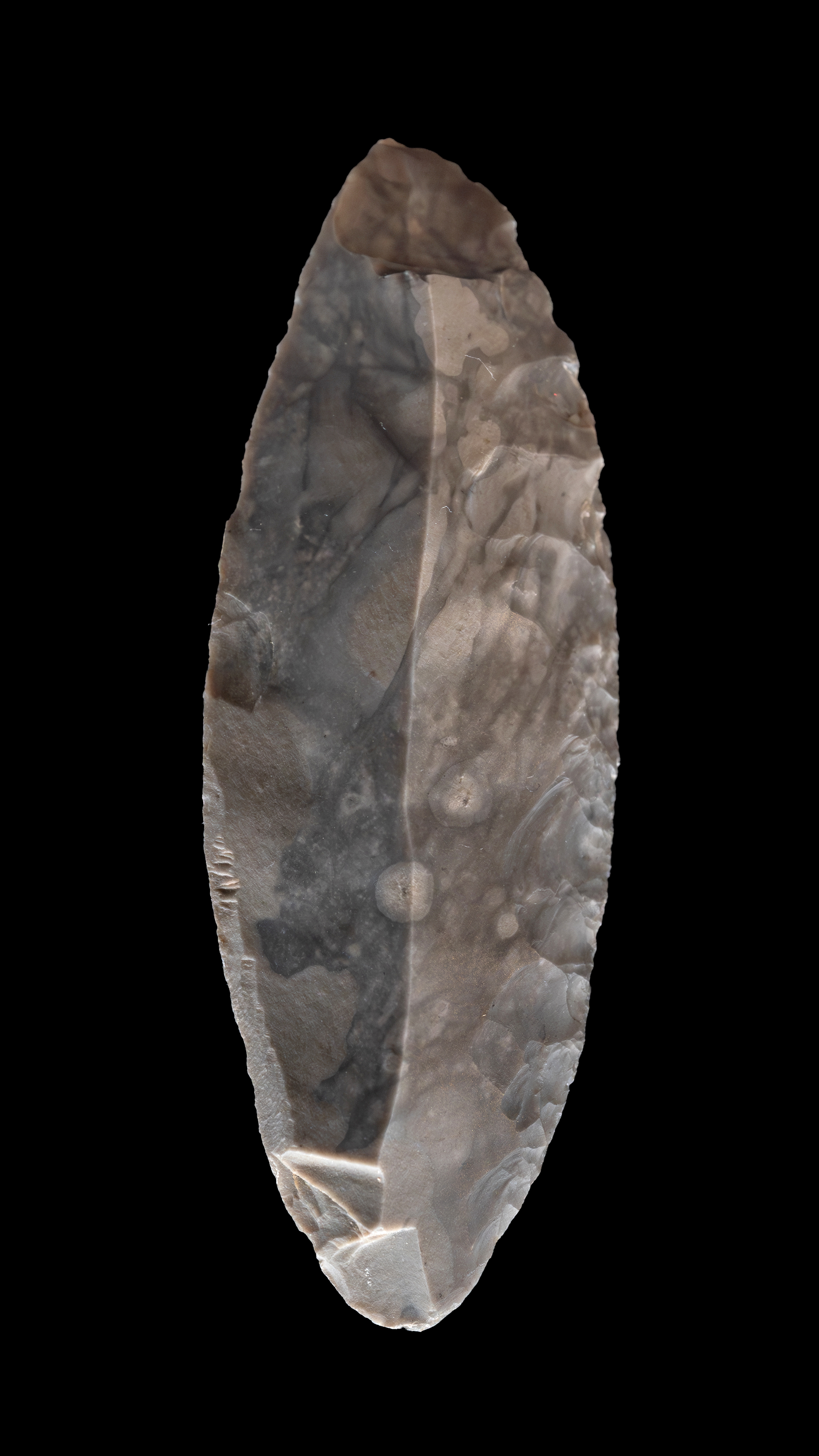
Example of a LRJ-type blade point from Ranis, Thuringia, Germany

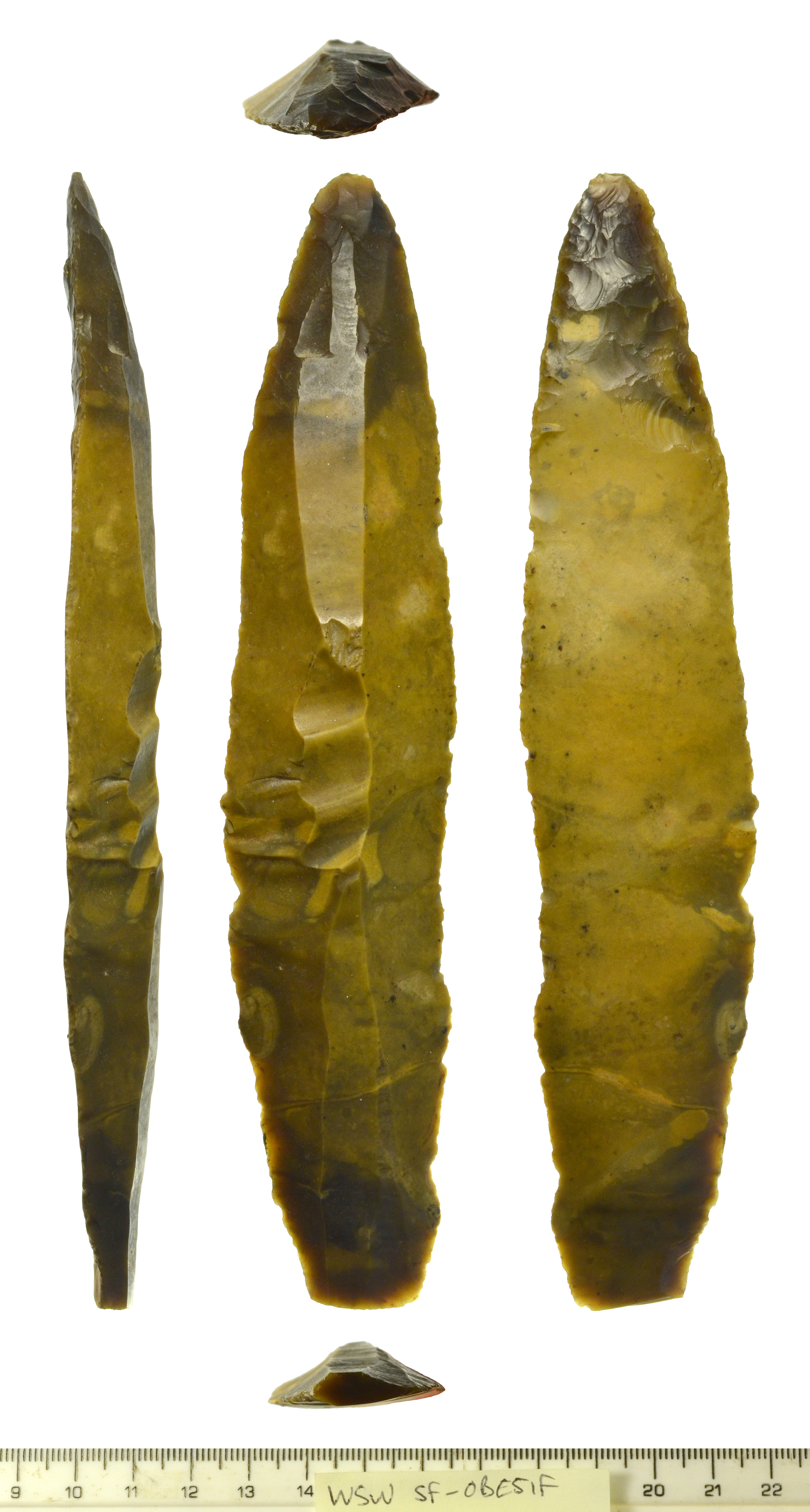
Probable LRJ point from Lackford Lakes, Sussex, England

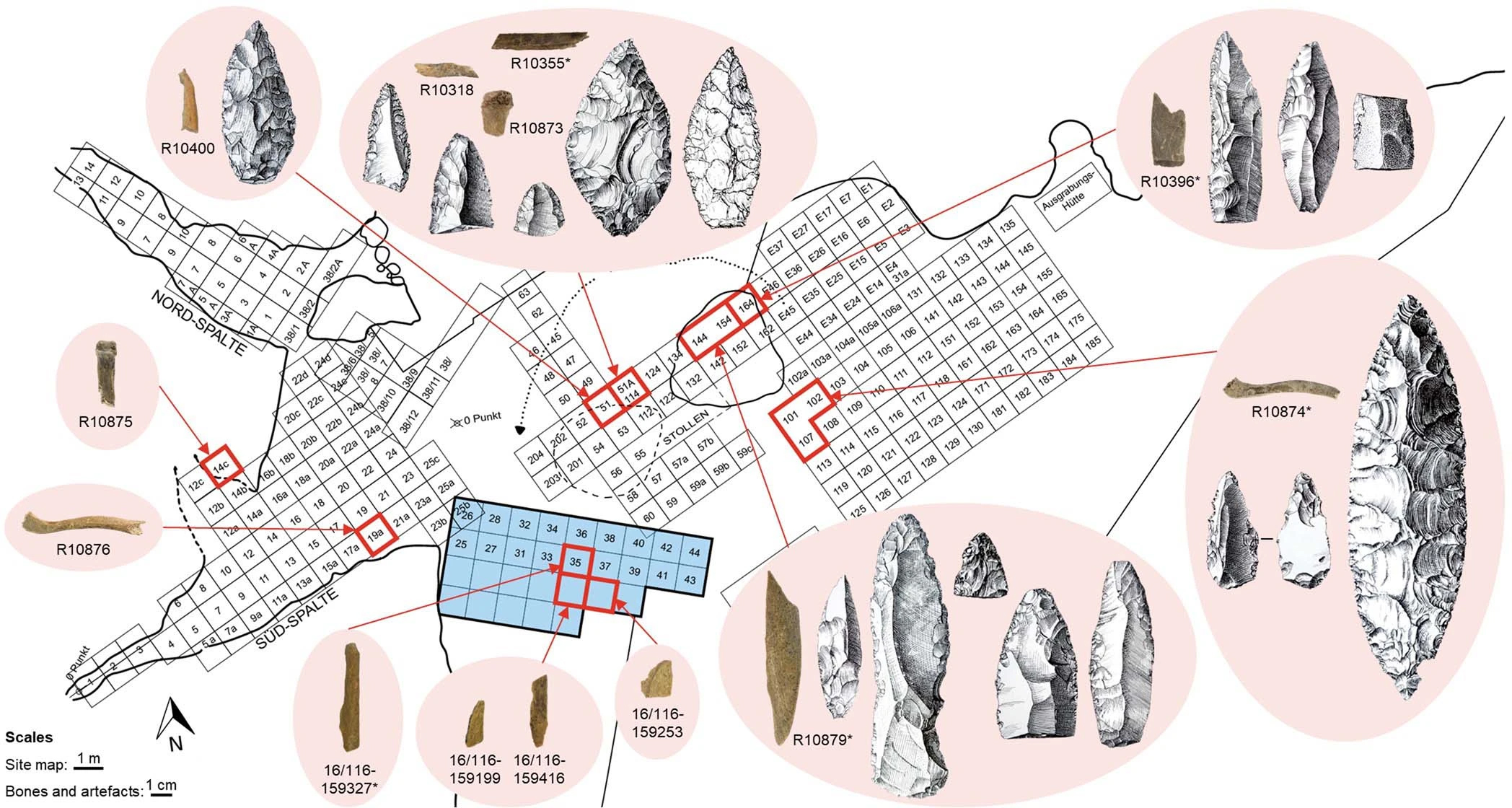
Map of Ranis with the location of human bones and selected LRJ lithic artefacts

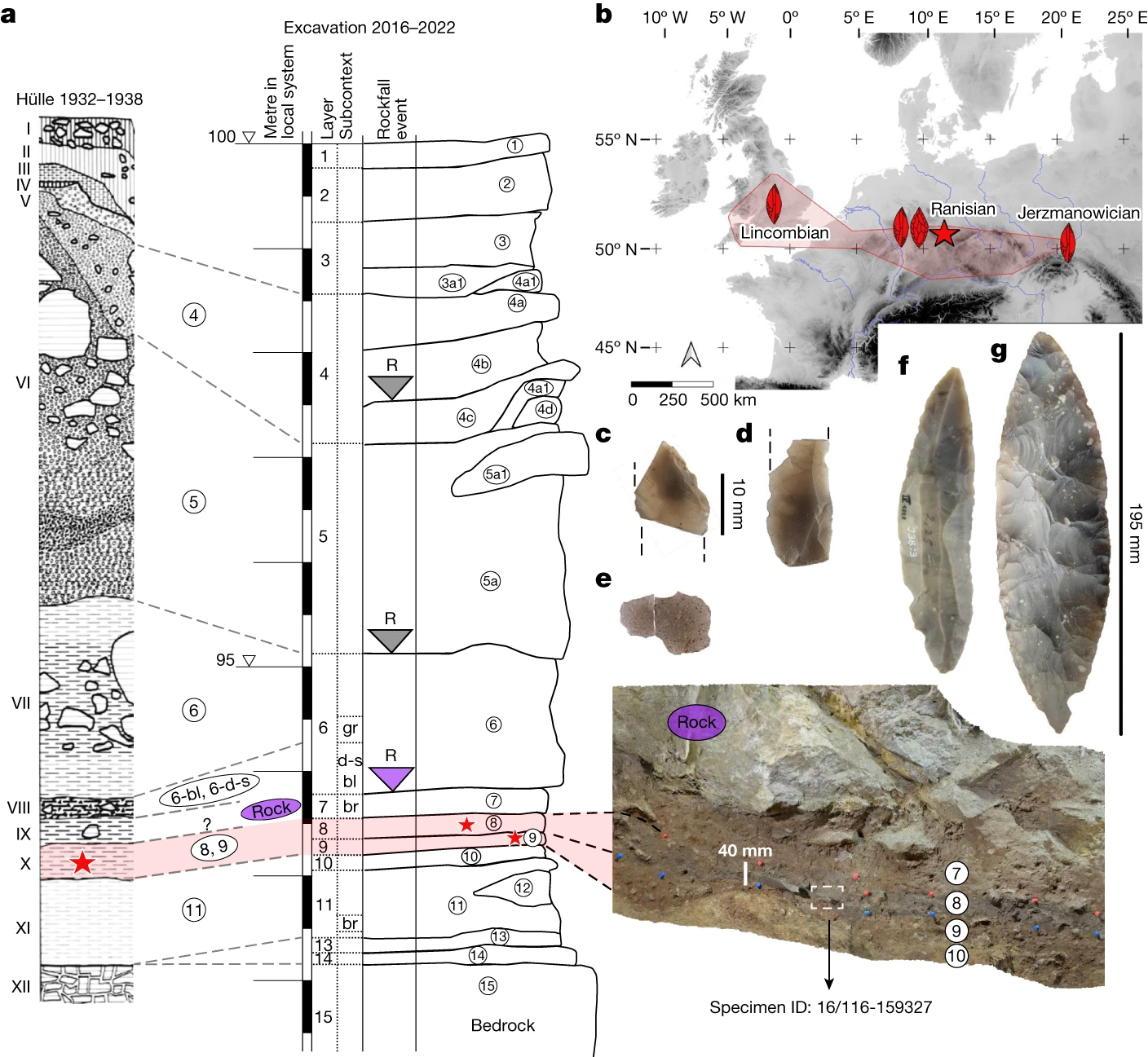
Stratigraphy of Ranis with more LRJ type stone tools

== Lifeways ==
The people of the LRJ complex lived in a cold glacial climate in a steppe tundra environment, alongside animals like woolly mammoths, woolly rhinoceros, wild horse, reindeer, red deer, cave bears, brown bears, wolverine, and cave hyenas. At Ilsenhöhle/Ranis, isotopic analysis indicates a diet heavy in large terrestrial mammals. LRJ peoples are thought to have been highly mobile, with the sparse number of bones with cut marks at Ilsenhöhle indicating that the cave was only briefly occupied during short visits.

== Genetics ==
Genetic sequencing of human remains found at Ilsenhöhle in Ranis associated with LRJ tools indicates that the producers of the technocomplex were modern humans, but a distinct early branch of the human migration out of Africa that diverged before the split between West Eurasians (related to modern Europeans and people in the Middle East) and East Eurasians (related to modern East and Southeast Asians, Siberian peoples and Native Americans) that became extinct and was not ancestral to later European Upper Palaeolithic human populations, such as those represented by the 38,000 year old Kostenki-14 individual, who is a member of an early diverging West Eurasian lineage. They were also unrelated to a 40,000 year old skeleton from Oase, Romania and several similarly aged skeletons from Bacho Kiro Cave, Bulgaria, who represented another basal lineage closer to but outside the West-East Eurasian split. The Zlatý kůň woman, a partial skeleton with a largely complete skull known from Koněprusy Caves in the Czech Republic, 230 kilometres (140 mi) away from Ilsenhöhle/Ranis, was found to be part of the same population as the LRJ-associated humans at Ilsenhöhle, with the Zlatý kůň woman found to be a distant relative (fifth or sixth-degree familial relationship) with two of the Ranis individuals, suggesting that they lived only 3 generations apart and thus roughly contemporaneous.

Genetic evidence from Ranis also indicates a small population size, with an effective population size of only a few hundred people, correlating with the sparse archaeological record of the LRJ complex.

== See also ==
- Transitional cultures : Châtelperronian - Uluzzian - Bohunician - Szeletian
- Follow-on cultures : Gravettian - Sungir - Kostenki
