= Fumane Cave =

Archaeological site in Italy

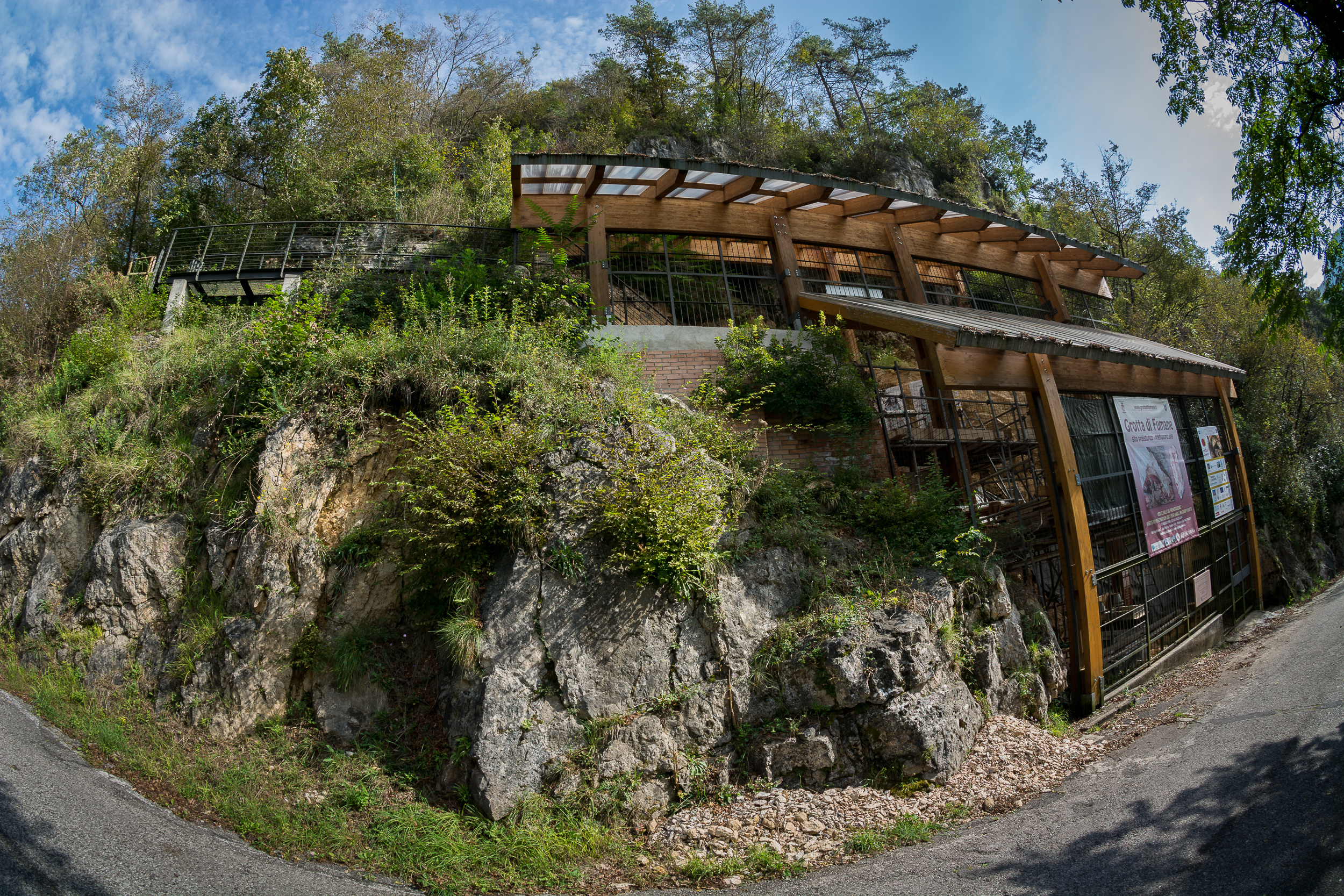
- Entrance to the Fumane cave
- Interactive map of Fumane Cave
- Cultures: Aurignacian, Uluzzian, Mousterian
- Associated with: Neanderthals, Early modern humans
- Location: Near the town of Fumane
- Region: Province of Verona, Italy

Site notes
- Material: Sandstone
- Area: 60 m^{2} (650 sq ft)
- Excavation dates: 1964, 1982, 1988-present
- Public access: Yes
- Website: grottadifumane.eu/en/

Fumane Cave (Italian: Grotta di Fumane) is a dolomite cave within the Fumane Valley in the Province of Verona, Italy, which was formed in the Neogene period. The cave contains rich evidence of three prehistoric hominid cultures: Mousterian, Uluzzian and Aurignacian. Additionally, the cave has some of the oldest cave art that has been discovered in Europe.

Although the archaeological site has been known since the 19th century, the first excavation took place in 1965. Systematic excavations have been almost continuously undertaken since 1988.

== Dating ==
The Uluzzian layer was dated with both the uranium–thorium dating and the electron spin resonance dating. Five herbivore teeth were used in this combined dating, returning a date between 38+/-6 thousand and 49+/-6 thousand BP. One flint fragment, and the sediment around it, were dated through thermoluminescence, giving an age of 50 thousand +/- 8 000 BP. Radiocarbon dating was used on charred wood and charcoal samples, returning a set of dates for the Uluzzian and the Mousterian. Calibrated dates place the end of Mousterian at around 44 000 BP, the Uluzzian at between 44 and 42 000 BP, and the proto-Aurignacian phase at 41-38 000 BP.

== Stratigraphy ==
Three cultures could be differentiated across eleven layers: Aurignacian, including Proto-aurignacian, which are the oldest early modern human cultures in Europe. The transitional Uluzzian, and the Middle Paleolithic Mousterian cultures are connected with Neanderthals. A total of 451 cores, 16 373 flakes and 1527 stone tools were found across the various layers.

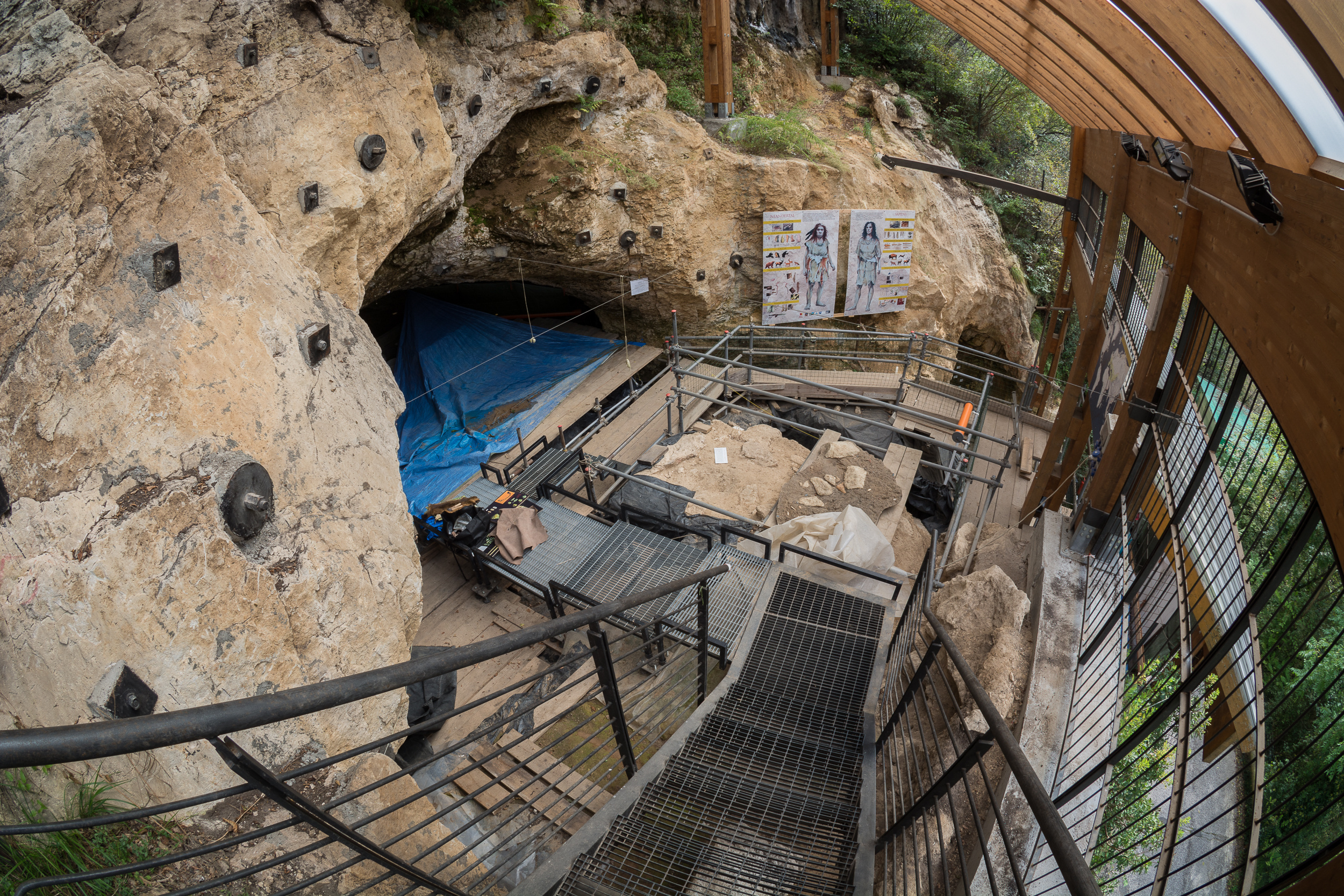
The excavation site of Fumane cave

=== Aurignacian ===
Early stage and exhausted cores from the proto-Aurignacian layer show core reduction techniques which aimed at manufacturing predetermined products. The first technique used linear and consecutive knapping to obtain blades and bladelets with sub-parallel edges. The second technique used alternate knapping progression to produce slender bladelets with a convergent shape. These techniques can be found in other proto-Aurignacian European sites as well. The Fumane cave finds support the idea that proto-Aurignacian is consistent across its geographic distribution.

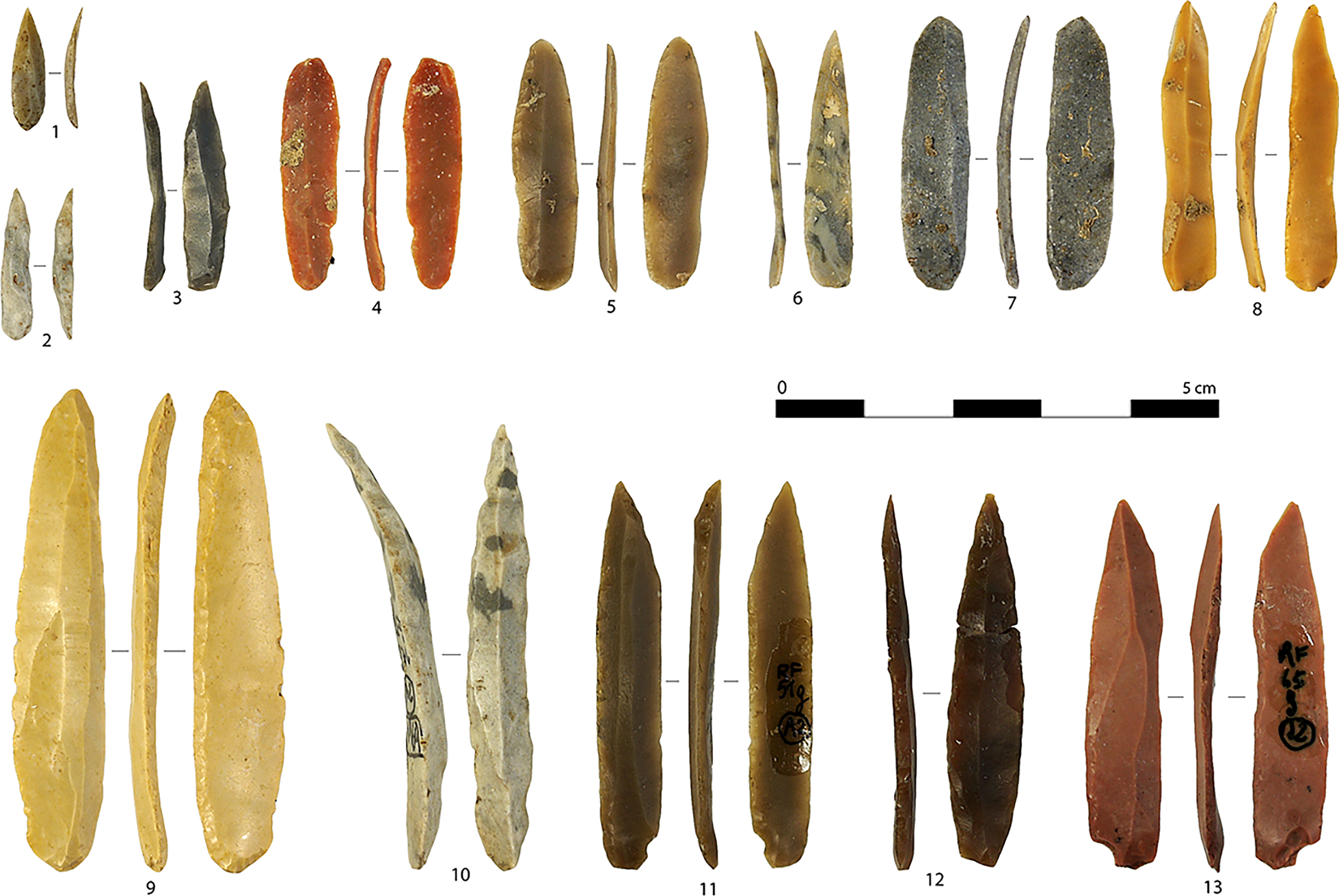
Retouched proto-Aurignacian bladelets from Fumane

The proto-Aurignacian and Aurignacian assemblage were dominated by ibex finds. 43% at D3 layer, 35.5% at D6 layer, 43.9% at A1 layer, with 18.4% of red deer finds, and 49.5% at A2-A2R layer, with 18.8% of red deer finds.

=== Uluzzian ===
The older stone tools were created using the Levallois technique, while the newer flakes and cores were made using the centripetal method. Blades and bladelets were recorded in the Uluzzian layer. In the initial portion of the Uluzzian phase, it was a flake-dominated industry. Sidescrapers and points were the most represented stone tool, with the Levallois technique being the most used method of their production. Backed knives and Upper Paleolithic tools become dominant in the later phase of the culture.

Uluzzian is only present in the A3 layer, and the faunal assemblage is dominated by two species: red deer at 29.5% and ibex at 20.3%.

=== Mousterian ===
The Levallois technique was the exclusive flaking technique used. Most of the artifacts found here are well preserved, devoid of abrasions, and slightly affected by patina.

The Mousterian is a culture exclusively connected with Neanderthals. As their aptitude for symbolic behavior is often disputed, the find of a fragmentary ochered fossile Aspa marginata shell is of particular interest, as pigment use is suggestive of symbolism. The shell is dated to 47.6-45 000 BP. The shell was brought to the cave from a great distance, of over 100 km. Microscopic analysis revealed a dark red substance, identified as hematite, was found smeared across the outer surface of the shell. It was likely worn as a pendant. Bone working is another criterion often mentioned for behavioral modernity. In a late Mousterian layer, a retouched bone shaft was found, modified through direct percussion. This transfer of knowledge from flint knapping usually implies a lack of raw lithic material, which wasn't the case for the Fumane Neanderthals.

The Moustarian faunal assemblage is almost evenly split between roe deer and red deer finds at A4, A9, A10 and A11 layers, with red deer being dominant in the A5-A6 layers at 70.3%. A number of avian bones found in the final Mousterian layer show signs of modification (cuts, scrapes, peeling), which do not serve feeding or utilitarian purposes. It seems that Neanderthals removed large feathers from a number of different birds, which could be linked to some form of symbolic behavior. The birds were also used for subsistence, which testifies to the Neanderthal ability to diversify their diet.

== Cave paintings ==
Stone slabs bearing images of a four-legged animal and a half-human, half-animal figure were discovered during the excavation of the cave. Three more figures could be seen on the slabs, but couldn't be identified due to their bad preservation. As they were embedded in the sediment, they could be dated to between 32 and 36 500 BP, which would make them contemporary to the Chauvet Cave paintings.

== Human remains ==
During the excavations conducted between 1989 and 2011, four human teeth were found. Three in the Mousterian layers, and one in the Uluzzian layer. Two of the three found in the Mousterian layer can be identified as Neanderthal. The remaining Mousterian tooth cannot be definitely identified due to incisal wear, while the Uluzzian tooth cannot be identified as only a fragment of it was found. Anonther tooth was found in the proto-Aurignacian layer, but is yet to be published. All of them were deciduous teeth, two of them belonging to six-year olds, and one of them to a child aged 10–11 years old. One of the Fumane individuals, "Fumane 2" has been directly dated to circa 40,000 BP.

== See also ==
- Art of the Upper Paleolithic
- List of Stone Age art
- List of caves in Italy
