= Arturo Palma di Cesnola =

Italian archaeologist (1928–2019)

Arturo Palma di Cesnola (14 March 1928 – 9 July 2019)Firenze is an Italian archaeologist. He has worked extensively on the Italian Upper Palaeolithic.

Palma di Cesnola defined the Uluzzien, one of the earliest modern human traditions in Europe, and is responsible for popularising the term Epigravettian for describing Upper Palaeolithic assemblages in Italy after the Last Glacial Maximum, a term coined by Georges Laplace in 1958. He was also among the first Italian researchers to popularise in Italy Laplace's "analytical typology" for describing stone tools.
