= Koněprusy =

- Municipality
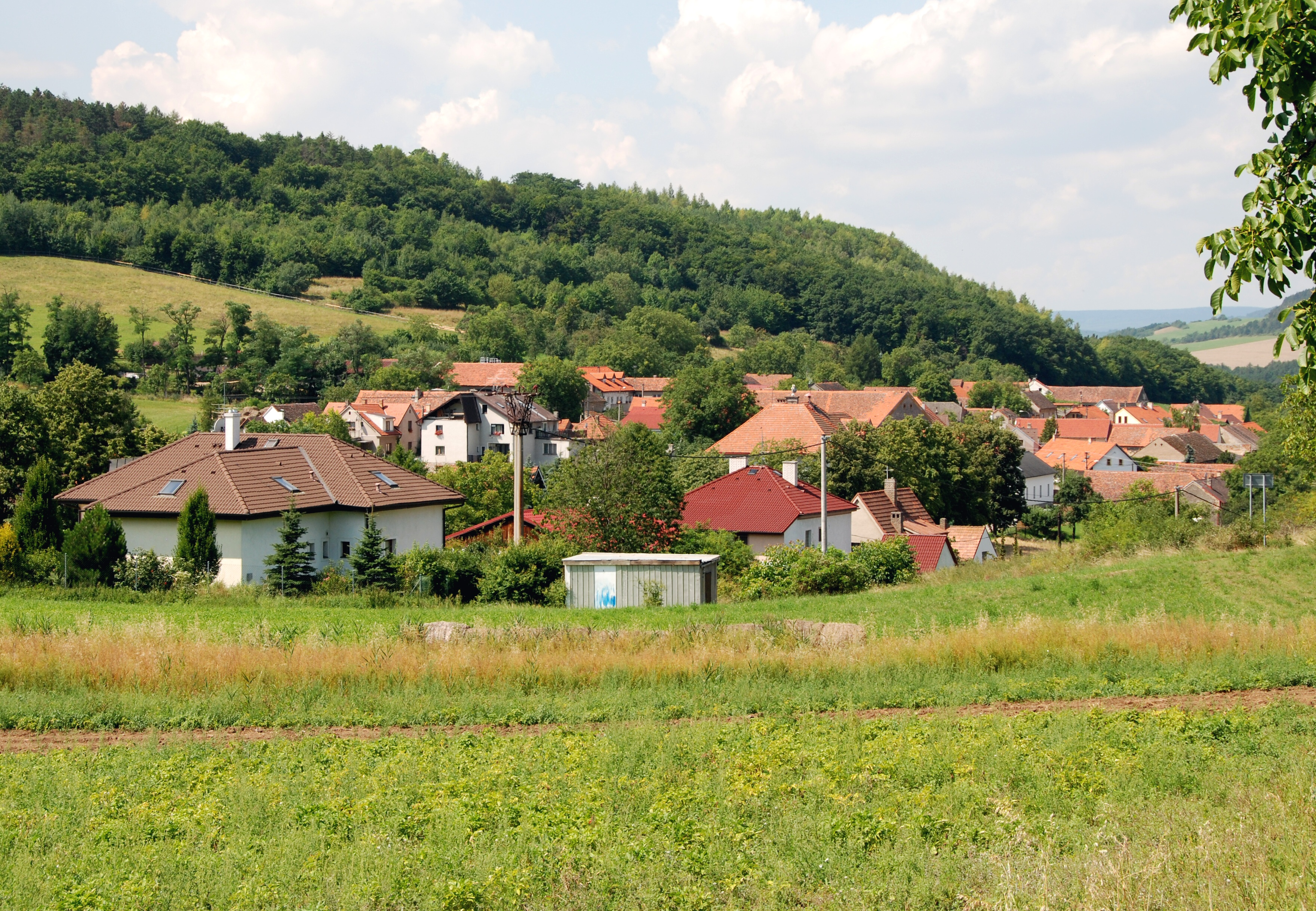
- View from the east

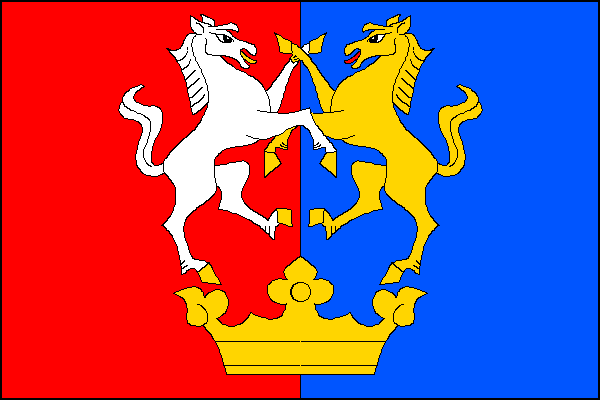
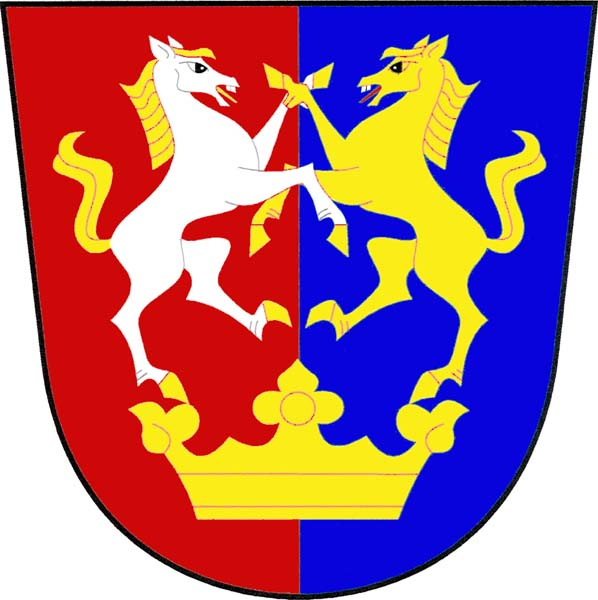
- Flag Coat of arms

- Location in the Czech Republic
- Coordinates: 49°55′16″N 14°3′57″E
- Country: Czech Republic
- Region: Central Bohemian
- District: Beroun
- First mentioned: 1391

Area
  - Total: 6.04 km^{2} (2.33 sq mi)
- Elevation: 368 m (1,207 ft)

Population (2026-01-01)
  - Total: 263
  - Density: 43.5/km^{2} (113/sq mi)
- Time zone: UTC+1 (CET)
  - Summer (DST): UTC+2 (CEST)
- Postal code: 266 01
- Website: koneprusy.cz

Koněprusy is a municipality and village in Beroun District in the Central Bohemian Region of the Czech Republic. It has about 300 inhabitants.

== Administrative division ==
Koněprusy consists of two municipal parts (in brackets population according to the 2021 census):

- Koněprusy (205)
- Bítov (39)

== Demographics ==
Historical population
Year	Pop.	±%
1869	314	—
1880	333	+6.1%
1890	344	+3.3%
1900	358	+4.1%
1910	421	+17.6%
1921	439	+4.3%
1930	411	−6.4%
1950	306	−25.5%
1961	297	−2.9%
1970	273	−8.1%
1980	239	−12.5%
1991	178	−25.5%
2001	184	+3.4%
2011	212	+15.2%
2021	244	+15.1%
Source: Censuses

== Sights ==
Koněprusy is known for the Koněprusy Caves. The three-storey cave system with an elevation of 70 metres (230 ft) has more than 2 kilometres (1.2 mi) of corridors and is the longest cave system in Bohemia.
