= Grotta del Cavallo =

Cave and archaeological site in Italy

- Cavallo Cave
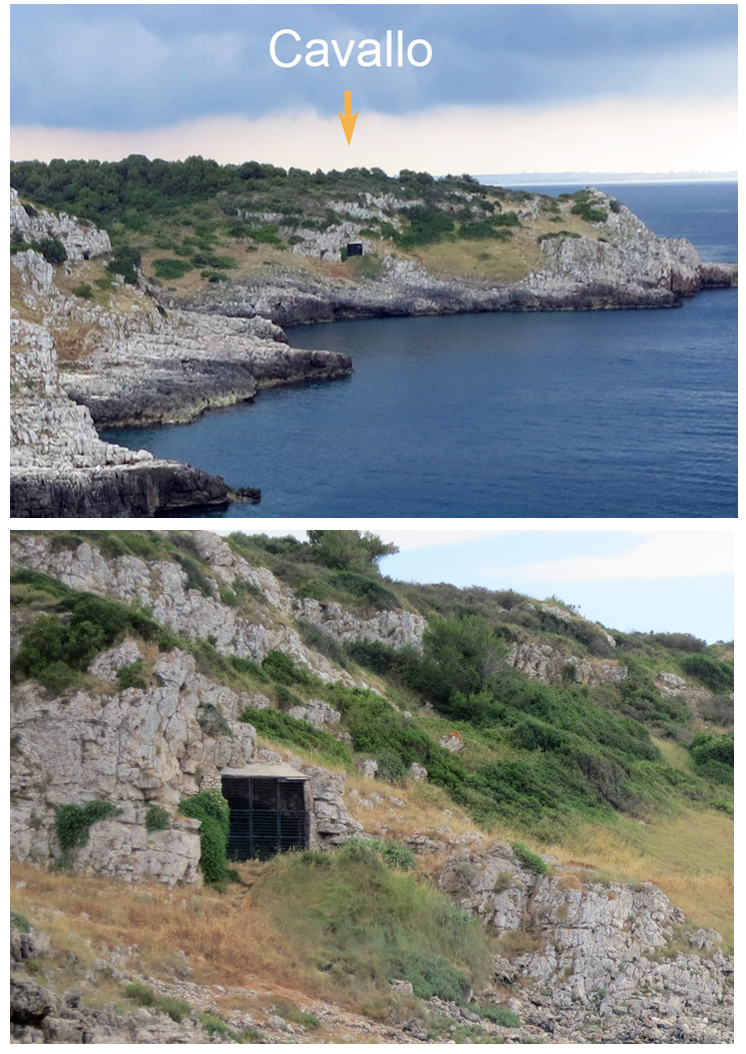

- Location within Italy
- Location: Apulia, Italy
- Coordinates: 40°9′18″N 17°57′36″E
- Geology: limestone

The Grotta del Cavallo or Cavallo Cave (Italian:"Cave of the Horse") is a limestone cave in the region of Apulia, Southern Italy, near Nardò 90 km (55.92 mi) south of Taranto. The cave is about 15 m (49 ft) above present sea level. It has a rounded entrance, 5 m (16.40 ft) wide and 2.5 m (8.20 ft) high opening toward the sea. The cave was rediscovered in 1960 and two waves of excavations ensued. The first wave spanning from 1963 to 1966 and the second from 1986 to 2008. The cave was disturbed by looters during the period between the two waves of excavations, damaging the layers corresponding to the Upper Palaeolithic; because of this, the cave entrance is covered by a gate and is closed to the public.

== Archaeology ==
=== Stratigraphy ===
The cave contains a rich stratigraphic succession with a depth of 7 m (23 ft), that is deposited on top of an interglacial beach foundation. The most notable section of this sequence covers the Middle Palaeolithic, associated with the Neanderthal Mousterian culture and recently discovered subsequent strata that were associated with the earliest known appearance of Anatomically modern humans in Europe.

=== Discoveries ===
In 1964 two deciduous molars were discovered in the cave. In 1967 researchers described the teeth as of Neanderthal origin and assumed that the accompanying stone tools and shell bead ornaments were typical of a Neanderthal culture, that was subsequently termed the Uluzzi culture as it closely resembles the Châtelperronian. However, the association of the Châtelperronian culture with Homo neanderthalensis is subject of ongoing debate. In 2011, a team of researchers led by Stefano Benazzi of the Department of Anthropology at the University of Vienna published a study in the journal Nature which concluded that the teeth are not of Neanderthal origin, but from an early Homo sapiens and date from 45,000 to 43,000 years BP. According to Benazzi these results allow the support of the hypothesis that the Uluzzi culture is not to be attributed to Neanderthals but to modern humans. Although the Human provenance of these teeth is contended, no evidence contradicting this claim has been put forward and it has gained some acceptance. However, the attribution of the entire Uluzzi technology to Anatomically Modern European Humans is more contentious.
