= Koněprusy Caves =

Cave and archaeological site in the Czech Republic

- Koněpruské jeskyně
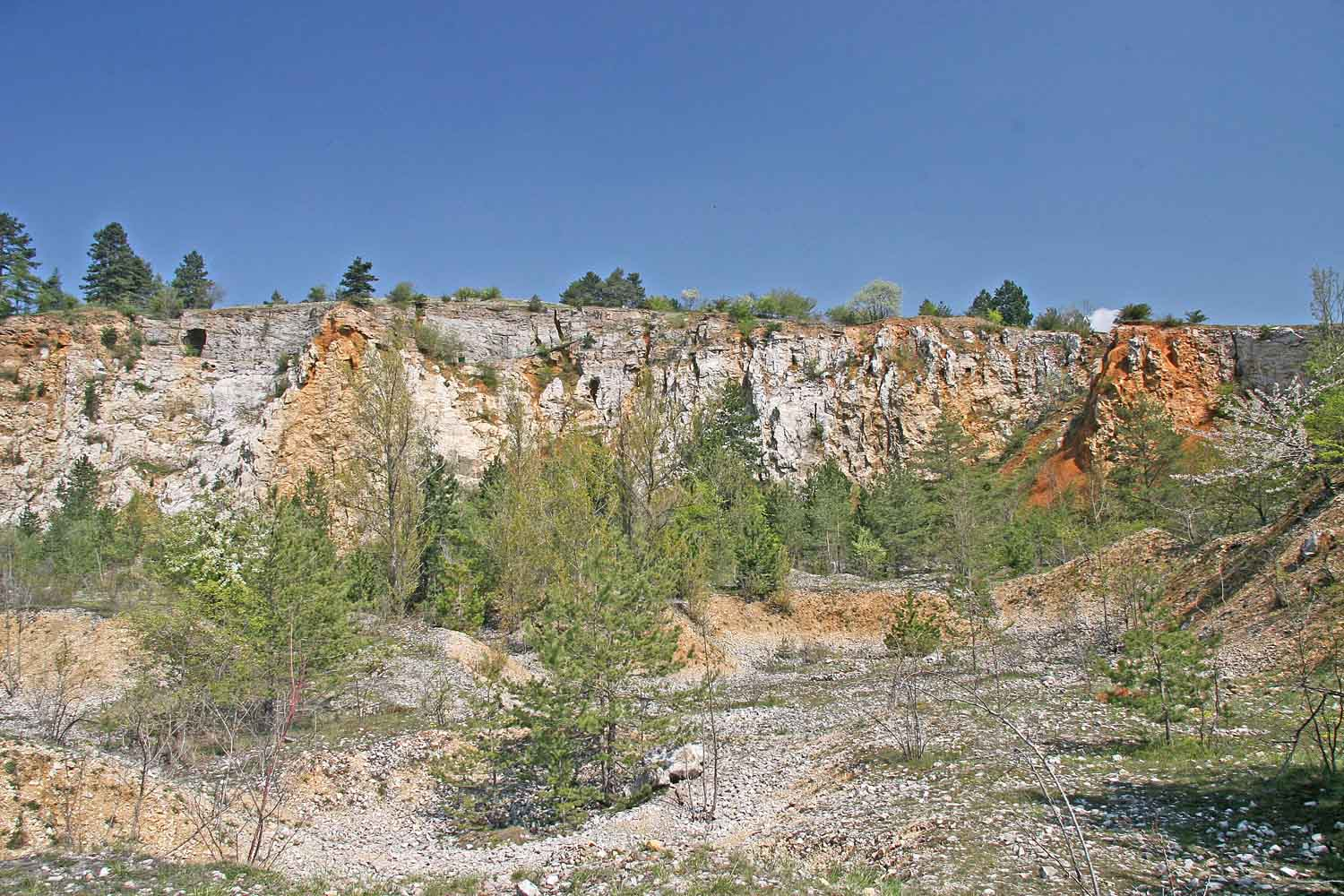
- Frontal wall of the Koněprusy Caves

- Location in the Czech Republic Koněprusy Caves (Czech Republic)
- 49°54′58.33″N 14°4′7.92″E
- Type: limestone karst
- Periods: Paleolithic
- Associated with: Paleo-humans
- Location: Koněprusy
- Region: Central Bohemian Region, Bohemian Karst, Czech Republic

Site notes
- Material: limestone
- Length: 2 km (1.24 mi)

Koněprusy Caves (Czech: Koněpruské jeskyně), also Zlatý kůň (Golden Horse), is a cave system in the Bohemian Karst in the Central Bohemian Region of the Czech Republic. It is located in the municipality of Koněprusy, about 25 kilometres (16 mi) southwest of Prague, 6 km (3.7 mi) south of Beroun. With the length of 2 km (1.2 mi) and vertical range of 70 m (230 ft), it is the largest cave system in Bohemia.

== The caves ==
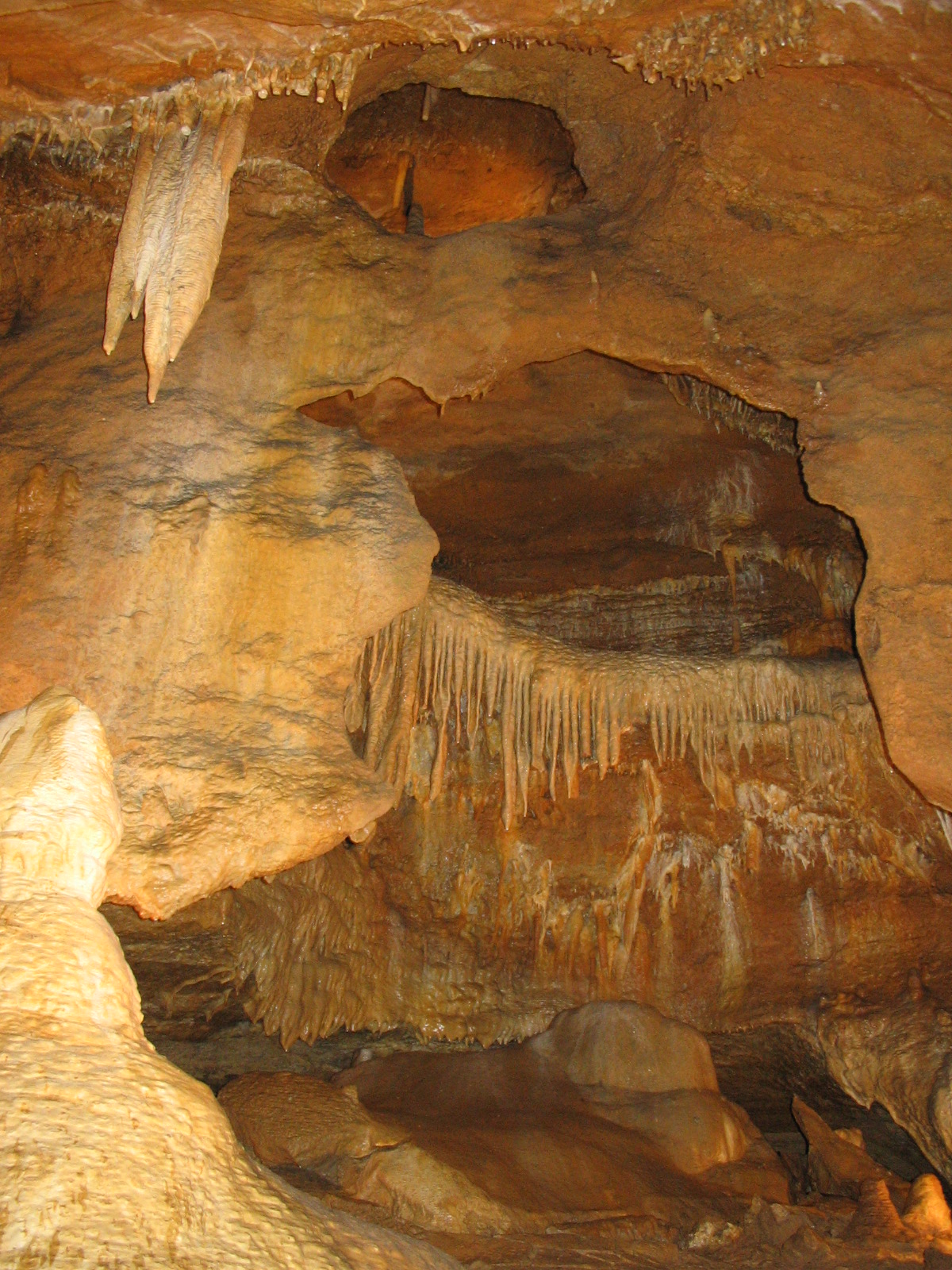
Interior

A hill called Zlatý kůň (Golden Horse) rises above the village of Koněprusy close to another hill called Kobyla (Mare), and nearby is a place called V koníku (In a Little Horse). A short journey westward leads to Kotýz, a karst plateau. The caves descend underground from a shaft near the top of the Golden Horse hill. Many legends have been created about Kotýz, such as one which tells of sacred horses used by the Celts for campaigns of war. A prehistoric settlement existed here which in Celtic times, according to experts, served as a place of cult worship. Druids possibly maintained a cult of the horse here.

Golden Horse hill conceals the most extensive cave system in Bohemia, accidentally discovered after a nearby blast in a limestone quarry in 1950. They were subsequently made accessible for the public in 1959. Spanning two kilometers and three levels, the cave system inside the Zlatý kůň hill consists of passages and domed chambers interconnected by shafts developed in limestone of the Devonian age. The caves were formed by a small stream at the end of the Tertiary period, as well as rainfall that seeped through cracks in the limestone, resulting in rich speleothem formations from an abundance of stalagmites and stalactites as well as little sinter lakes. A tour leads visitors through the upper and middle levels of the cave system. The most beautiful area is deemed by experts to be the extensive Prošek chamber with its sinter Jezírko lásky (Little lake of love). The cave contains speleothems referred to colloquially as "Koněprusy Roses", formed by the gradual precipitation of dissolved calcium carbonate on the walls of the underground lake, creating an unusual formation reminiscent of rose blooms.

== Findings ==
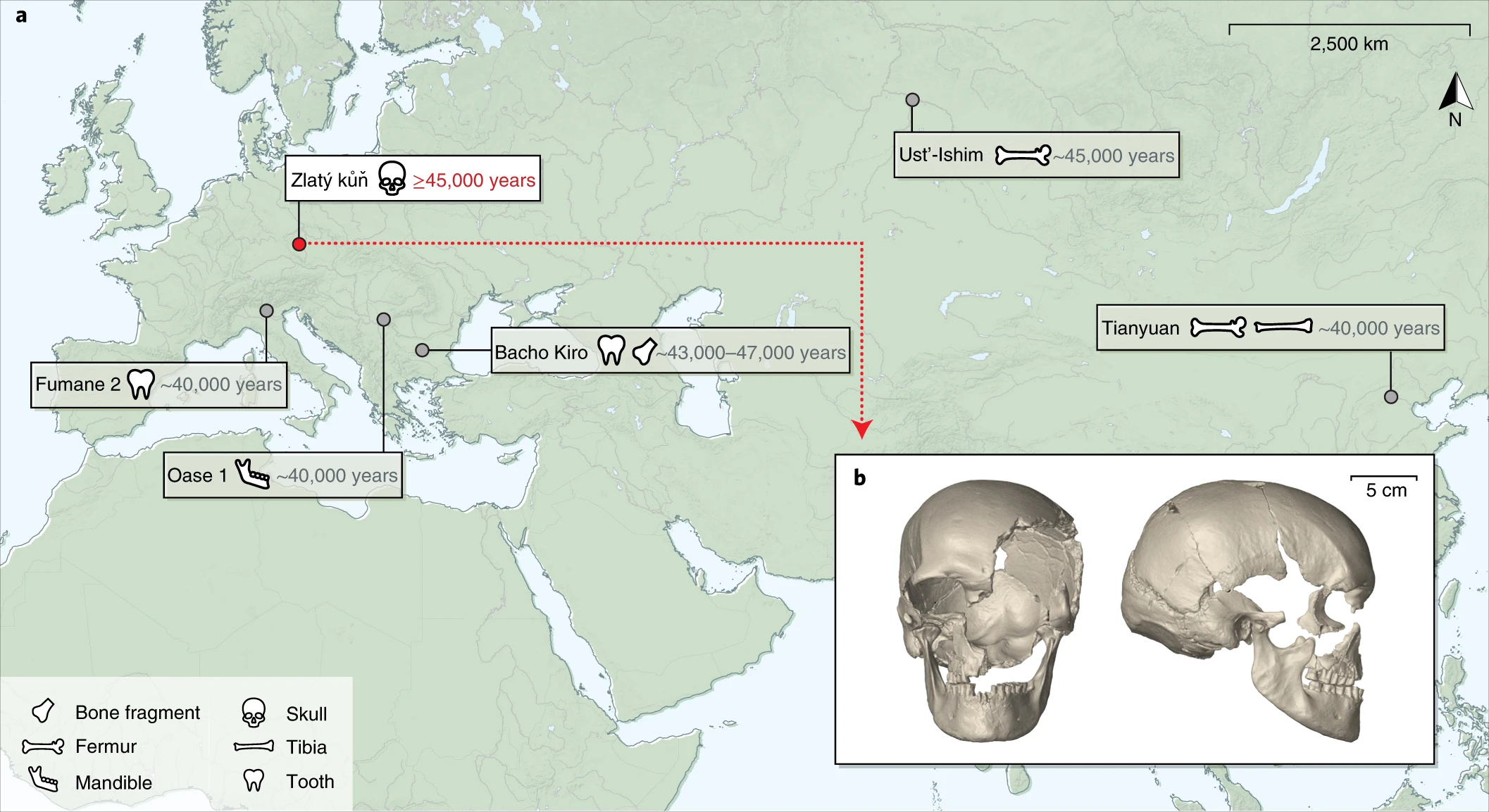
Location of the Zlatý kůň fossil with an age of at least ~40,000 years, that yielded genome-wide data.

Paleontologists have excavated from these caves thousands of prehistoric animal bones from the Pleistocene period. Dating back 200,000 to 300,000 years, findings include the remains of many species including mastodons, sabre-toothed cats, monkeys, cave bears, deer, reindeer, cave lions, woolly rhinos, wolves, beavers, hyenas and horses.

The fossilized bones of prehistoric humans dated to about 45,000 years (the Zlatý kůň woman), stone tools, and decorative objects from the early Stone Age provide evidence that prehistoric humans too found refuge in the caves. A counterfeiter's workshop, since dubbed "the Mint", was discovered on the upper level of the caves. From about 1460 to 1470, unknown forgers made the Hussite coins bearing the symbol of the Czech lion. Instead of silver they used copper thinly plated with silver amalgam.

== See also ==
- Moravian Karst
