= Uluzzian =

Paleolithic culture in Italy and Greece

Uluzzo culture
- Geographical range: South Italy, Peloponnese
- Period: Initial Upper Paleolithic
- Dates: c. 44,000 BC – c. 37,000 BC
- Preceded by: Mousterian
- Followed by: Proto-Aurignacien

Selected Uluzzian sites from the ROAD database (CC BY-SA 4.0 ROCEEH)

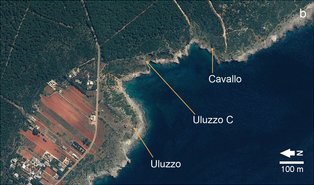
Caves overlooking the Bay of Uluzzo.

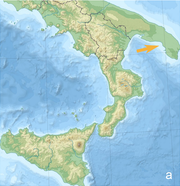
Bay of Uluzzo in relation to the Gulf of Taranto.

The Uluzzian Culture is a transitional archaeological culture between the Middle Paleolithic and the Upper Paleolithic, found in Italy and Greece.

A team led by archaeological scientist Katerina Douka has dated the Uluzzian as lasting from shortly before 45,000 to around 39,500 years before present (BP), at a similar date or slightly earlier than the Campanian Ignimbrite eruption.

Geographical extent: In Italy: Apulia (the Grotta del Cavallo and the Uluzzo cave), Basilicata, Campania, Calabria, Tuscany, and Fumane (the northernmost point). Outside of Italy, only in Argolis, Greece (the cave of Klissoura).

== Discovery ==
Entrance to the Grotta del Cavallo (photo: Thilo Parg, 2019).

Excavations by 1963 Arturo Palma di Cesnola of the Grotta del Cavallo ("Cave of the Horse") in southern Italy uncovered the first remains later called "Uluzzian". The cave is on the Salento peninsula in Apulia, overlooking the Gulf of Taranto. The only human remains were two deciduous teeth (Cavallo B and Cavallo C) from the Uluzzian deposit of Grotta del Cavallo identified as human by (Benazzi et al., 2011).

== Middle to Upper Paleolithic transition ==
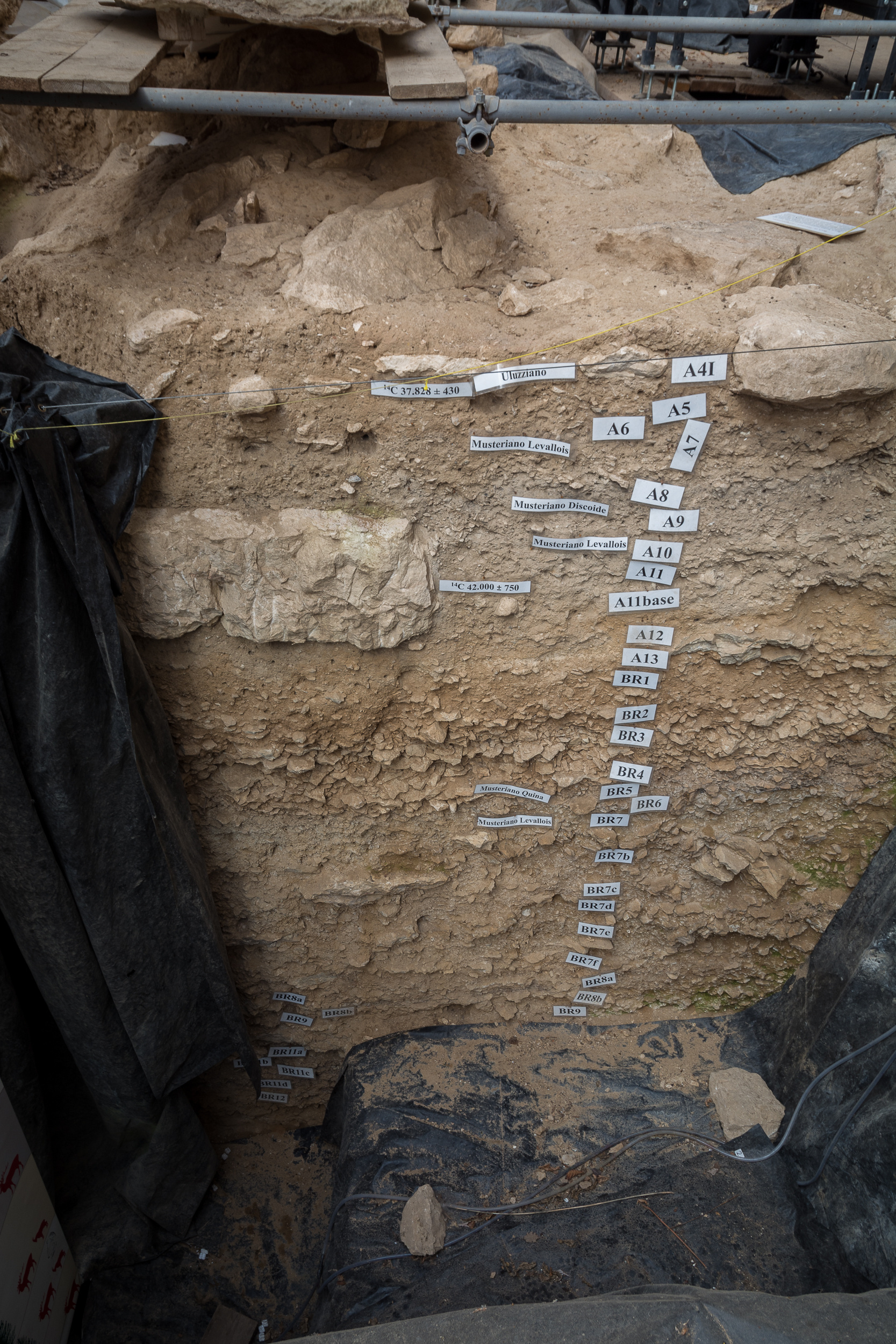
Stratigraphy of deposits on the floor of the Fumane Cave (photo:Thilo Parg, 2014).

The Uluzzian is one of several techno-complexes considered to be "transitional assemblages": Uluzzian, Châtelperronian, Szeletian, and Lincombian-Ranisian-Jerzmanowician.

== Culture ==
The Uluzzians made and used beads from shells of marine molluscs such as scaphopods, snails (Columbella rustica, Cyclope neritea), and other species.

== See also ==
- Bacho Kiro cave
