= Fumane =

- Comune
- Comune di Fumane
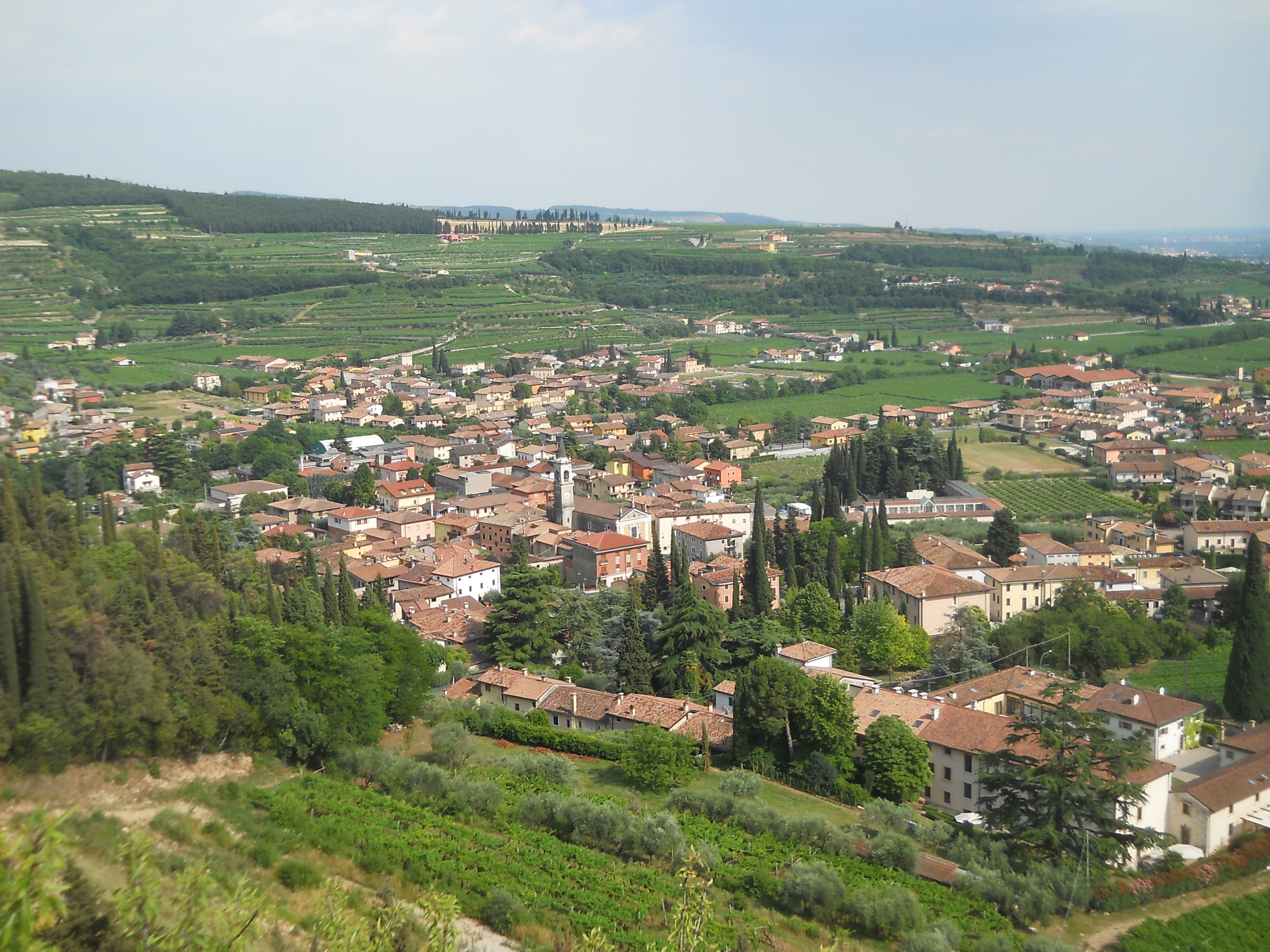

- Coat of arms

- Location within Italy Location within Veneto
- Coordinates: 45°33′N 10°53′E
- Country: Italy
- Region: Veneto
- Province: Province of Verona (VR)
- Frazioni: Mazzurega, Cavalo, Molina, Breonio

Area
  - Total: 34.3 km^{2} (13.2 sq mi)
- Elevation: 198 m (650 ft)

Population (Dec. 2004)
  - Total: 3,908
  - Density: 114/km^{2} (295/sq mi)
- Demonym: Fumanesi
- Time zone: UTC+1 (CET)
  - Summer (DST): UTC+2 (CEST)
- Postal code: 37022, 37020 frazioni
- Dialing code: 045

Fumane is a comune (municipality) in the Province of Verona in the Italian region Veneto, located about 110 kilometres (68 mi) west of Venice and about 15 kilometres (9 mi) northwest of Verona. As of 31 December 2004, it had a population of 3,908 and an area of 34.3 square kilometres (13.2 mi^{2}).

The municipality of Fumane contains the frazioni (subdivisions, mainly villages and hamlets) Mazzurega, Cavalo, Molina, and Breonio.

Fumane borders the following municipalities: Dolcè, Marano di Valpolicella, San Pietro in Cariano, Sant'Ambrogio di Valpolicella, and Sant'Anna d'Alfaedo.

== Demographic evolution ==
Historical population

| Year | Pop. | ±% |
|---|---|---|
| 1861 | ? | — |
| 1871 | 3,590 | — |
| 1881 | 4,044 | +12.6% |
| 1901 | 4,379 | +8.3% |
| 1911 | 4,594 | +4.9% |

| Year | Pop. | ±% |
|---|---|---|
| 1921 | 4,656 | +1.3% |
| 1931 | 3,953 | −15.1% |
| 1936 | 3,722 | −5.8% |
| 1951 | 3,887 | +4.4% |
| 1961 | 3,564 | −8.3% |

| Year | Pop. | ±% |
|---|---|---|
| 1971 | 3,518 | −1.3% |
| 1981 | 3,412 | −3.0% |
| 1991 | 3,425 | +0.4% |
| 2001 | 3,816 | +11.4% |

Source: Data from ISTAT

== Twin towns ==
Fumane is twinned with:

- Tratalias, Italy
- Urdinarrain, Argentina
- Atapuerca, Province of Burgos, Spain
