= Neanderthal station =

Train station in Germany

Neanderthal
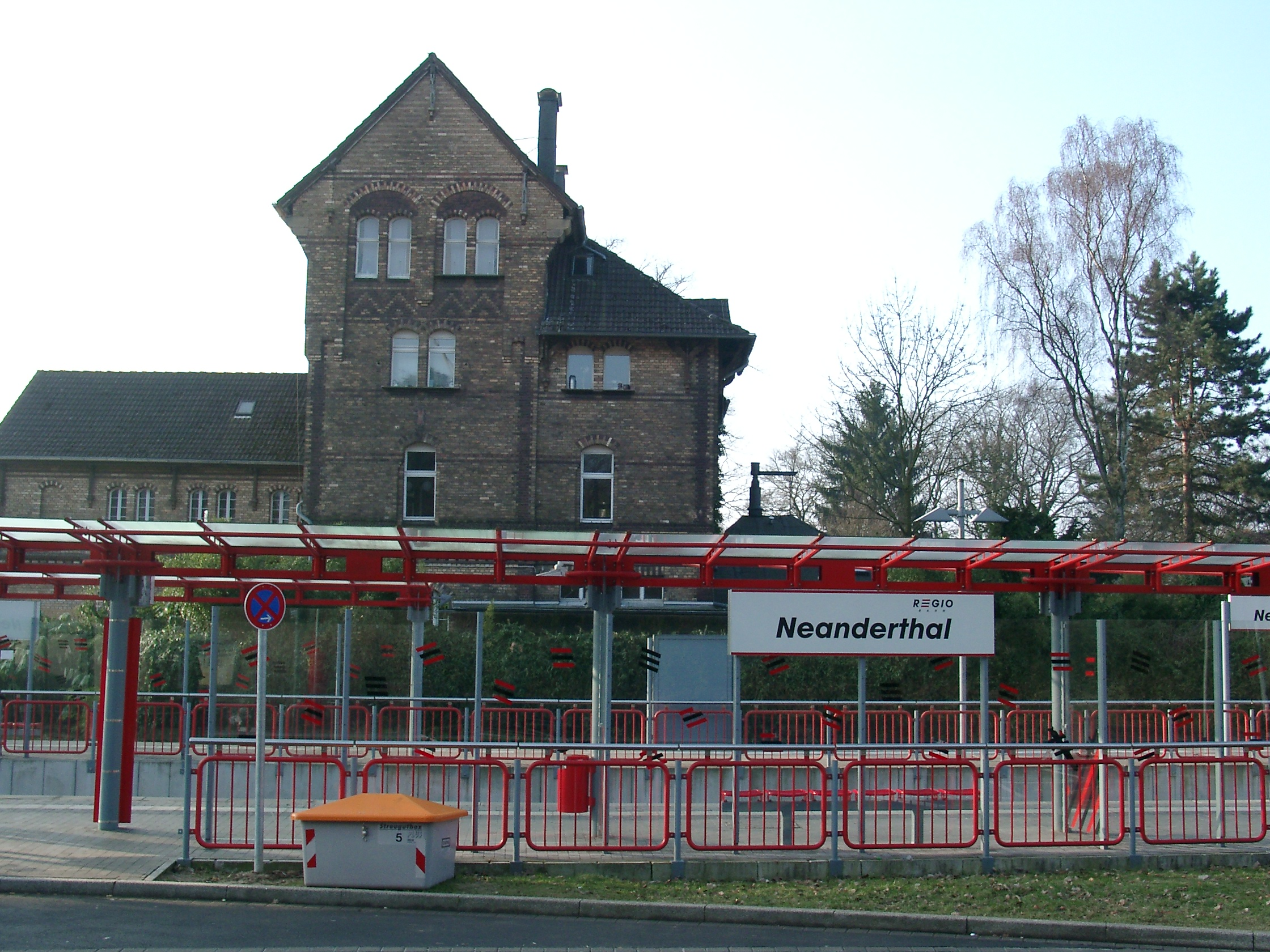

General information
- Location: Mettmann, NRW; Germany
- Coordinates: 51°13′40″N 6°57′11″E
- Line: Düsseldorf–Mettmann
- Platforms: 2

Construction
- Accessible: Yes

Other information
- Station code: n/a
- DS100 code: KNEA
- Fare zone: VRR: 540 and 640
- Website: www.regiobahn.de

History
- Opened: 15 September 1879

Services
Preceding station	Rhine-Ruhr S-Bahn	Following station
Erkrath Nord towards Kaarster See	S28	Mettmann Zentrum towards Wuppertal Hbf
Location
- Location within North Rhine-Westphalia Location within Germany Location within Europe

Neanderthal station is a Rhine-Ruhr S-Bahn station in the town of Mettmann in the German state of North Rhine-Westphalia. It was opened on 15 September 1879. It is located in the Neandertal (Neander Valley), which prior to the German spelling reform of 1901 was spelled as Neanderthal.

The reason why the outdated spelling of the station was not updated is not clear. In German, even the spelling of the Neanderthal man (whose fossils were first found in the area) has been updated to Neandertaler from the outdated Neanderthaler. The nearby Neanderthal Museum and the municipality of Mettmann have adopted the policy that all names referring to the prehistoric humans have the "h", so they in fact use the spelling Neanderthaler for the species, which is not done anywhere else anymore in German-speaking areas, but even they do not spell the valley in the outdated way anymore (except seemingly in the name of the museum, which is in fact English, not German). The municipality claims that the German rail authority would not change the spelling because of the proximity of the museum.

== History ==
On 15 September 1879 the Rhenish Railway Company opened the last section of its Düsseldorf-Derendorf–Dortmund Süd railway, locally known as the Wuppertaler Nordbahn (Wuppertal North Railway), from Mettmann station (now Mettmann Stadtwald station) to the Rhenish Railway's Düsseldorf station.

Along with this line, Neanderthal station was also put into operation and the station building was inaugurated. This still exists today, but is no longer used for its original purpose. In the 1980s the whole station area and the station building were purchased by the landscape gardener Richard Bödeker and rebuilt as a residence. The history of the railway was considered in the design of the gardens and parks around the station and the grounds are filled with old artifacts of the railway history along the course of old Nordbahn as well as hundreds of species of bamboo and elaborately designed wall coatings and ground coverings.

The station had local importance. In addition to the two rail tracks (tracks 1 and 2), each with a platform, it had a fast reversible bypass track (track 3), three marshalling and stabling tracks (tracks 4–6), as well as a siding for freight trains to the nearby Mannesmann lime plant.

Recently, the line was used only by railcars and local freight trains. On 2 January 1999, Deutsche Bahn closed passenger services over the whole line and sold Neanderthal station with a section of the line to Regionale Bahngesellschaft Kaarst-Neuss-Düsseldorf-Erkrath-Mettmann-Wuppertal mbH (shortened to Regiobahn GmbH) on 1 January 1998.

== Current situation ==
Following the acquisition of the line by Regiobahn it was upgraded for S-Bahn operations and all stations were extensively reconstructed and modernised.

Neanderthal station was reduced to being just a halt (that it no longer had any sets of points), all tracks except tracks 1 and 2 were dismantled. The platform next to the station building, which had been used for the stopping of trains towards Mettmann, was demolished. Trains have since stopped at the island platform between the tracks 1 and 2. Since this platform is relatively narrow, a new platform was built for the trains towards Düsseldorf on the site of the former bypass track (track 3), which can be entered directly from the bus station.

Since 26 September 1999, the Regiobahn has operated line S 28 of the Rhine-Ruhr S-Bahn—initially every hour, but from 28 May 2000 at 20-minute intervals.

=== Services ===
The station is served by the Rhine-Ruhr S-Bahn line S 28 service. It is operated by Regiobahn.

Mondays to fridays

- Westbound
  - 3 trains per hour to Kaarster See via Düsseldorf and Neuss
- Eastbound
  - 2 trains per hour to Wuppertal via Mettmann
  - 1 train per hour to Mettmann Stadtwald

Saturdays, sundays

- Westbound
  - 2 trains per hour to Kaarster See via Düsseldorf and Neuss
- Eastbound
  - 2 trains per hour to Wuppertal via Mettmann

The station is also served by bus route O12 (Posener Str – Kaldenberg – Ratinger Str.) operated by Rheinbahn at 20- to 60-minute intervals.
