= Montesquieu-Avantès =

Commune in Occitanie, France

- Commune
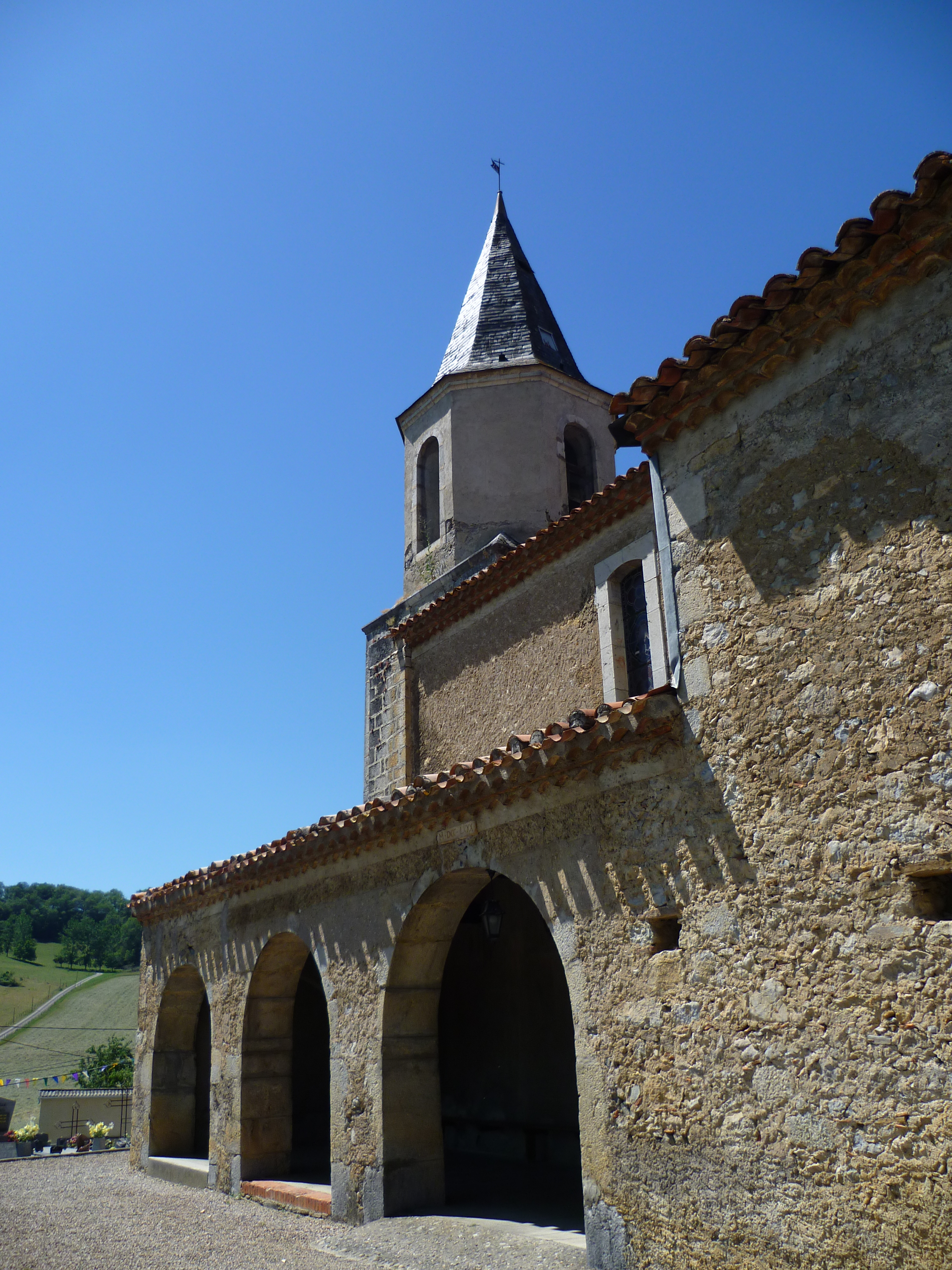
- The church in Montesquieu-Avantès
- Location of Montesquieu-Avantès
- Location within France Location within Occitanie
- Coordinates: 43°01′28″N 1°11′51″E
- Country: France
- Region: Occitania
- Department: Ariège
- Arrondissement: Saint-Girons
- Canton: Portes du Couserans

Government
  - Mayor (2020–2026): Jocelyne Fert
- Area^{1}: 16.52 km^{2} (6.38 sq mi)
- Elevation: 470 m (1,540 ft)
- Highest elevation: 690 m (2,260 ft)
- Lowest elevation: 430 m (1,410 ft)
- Population (2023): 263
  - Density: 15.9/km^{2} (41.2/sq mi)
- Time zone: UTC+01:00 (CET)
  - Summer (DST): UTC+02:00 (CEST)
- INSEE/Postal code: 09204 /09200
- ^{1} French Land Register data, which excludes lakes, ponds, glaciers > 1 km^{2} (0.386 sq mi or 247 acres) and river estuaries.

Montesquieu-Avantès (French pronunciation: [mɔ̃tɛskjø avɑ̃tɛs]) is a commune in the Ariège department in southwestern France.

== History ==
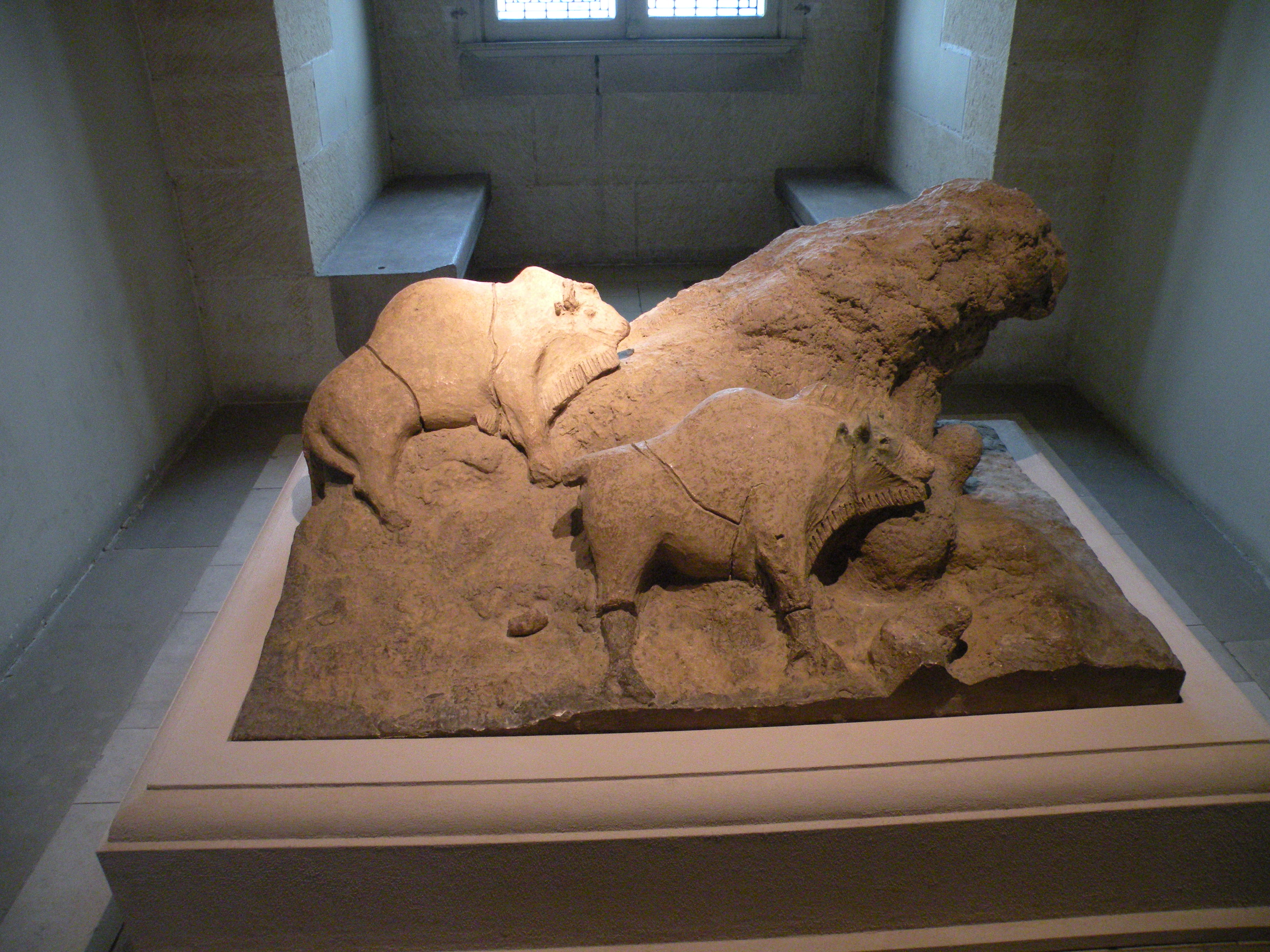
Clay sculpted bison from Trois Frères (facsimile)

Montesquieu-Avantès has a significant prehistory in the Pyrenees. The cave-complex was carved out by the Volp River resulting in three extensive caverns: Enlène Cave, Trois-Frères and Tuc d'Audoubert. They were discovered by the Begouën children on 10 October 1912.

The caves contain unique works of art. The Salle des Bisons features two masterfully modelled bison, which were sculpted in clay with a stone spatula-like tool 17,000 years ago and show the imprint of the artist's fingers. The pair are among the largest and finest surviving prehistoric sculptures.

Occupied in the Upper Palaeolithic, notably during the Magdalenian Epoch, the caves have been extensively studied. These works on Tuc d'Audoubert were compiled in 2009 in a monograph entitled "The Secret Sanctuary of the Bison". A subsequent book entitled "The Cave of the Three Brothers" ("La Caverne des Trois-Frères") documents a century of research. It was published in 2014 on the centenary of its discovery, on 20 July 1914.

These extremely fragile caves are closed to the public for the purposes of preservation.

Montesquieu was a country house founded in 1272 on the initiative of the Comte de Comminges Bernard VI.

== Population ==
Historical population
| Year | Pop. | ±% p.a. |
|---|---|---|
| 1968 | 323 | — |
| 1975 | 265 | −2.79% |
| 1982 | 280 | +0.79% |
| 1990 | 270 | −0.45% |
| 1999 | 240 | −1.30% |
| 2007 | 233 | −0.37% |
| 2012 | 257 | +1.98% |
| 2017 | 245 | −0.95% |
| 2023 | 263 | +1.19% |
Source: INSEE

== See also ==
- Communes of the Ariège department
