= Tracking in Caves =

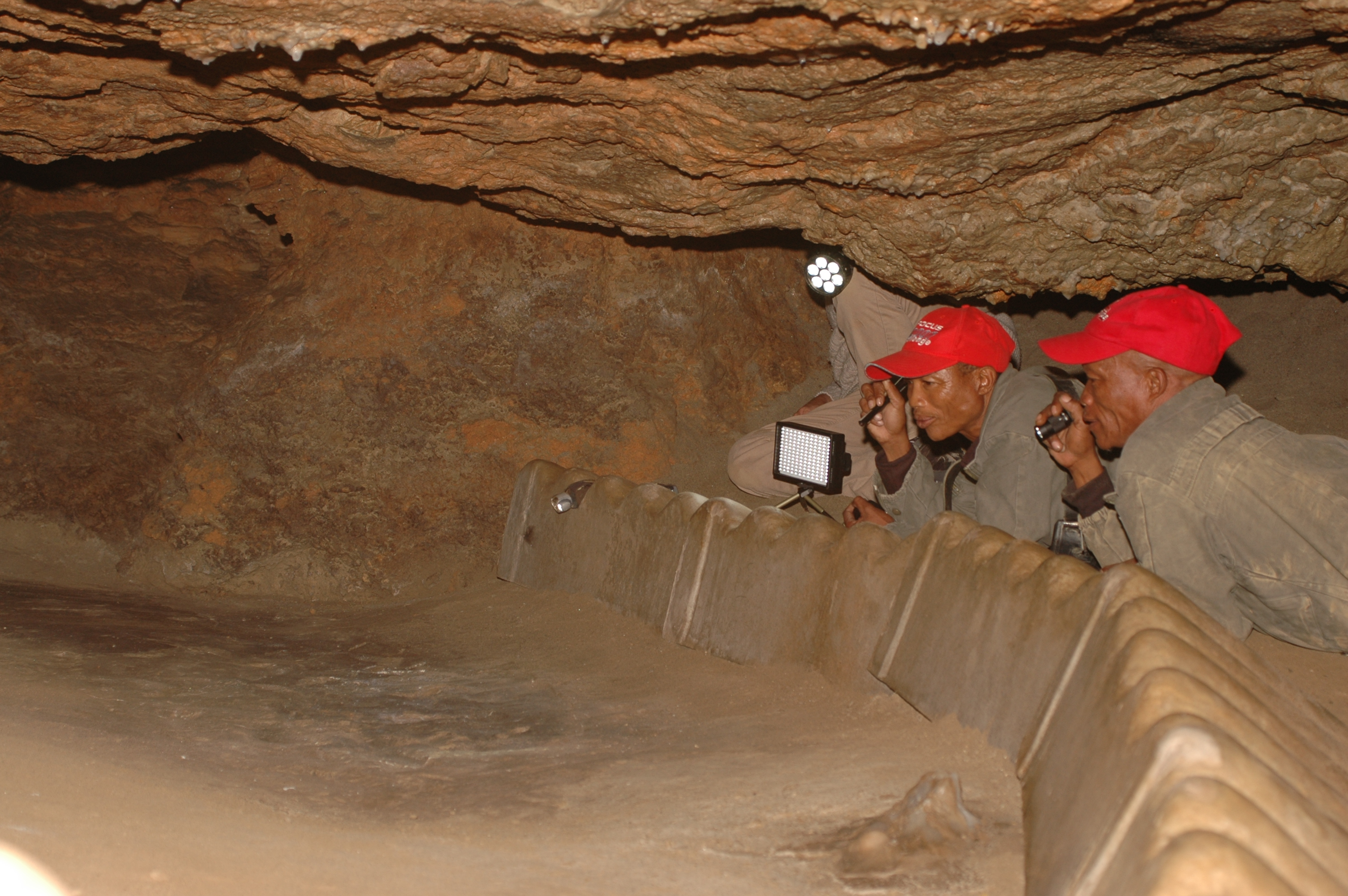
Ui Kxunta and Thui Thao inspect the tracks in Niaux Cave

Tracking in Caves is an international archaeology project focusing on reading and understanding human tracks in archaeological contexts. The project combines Western scientific approaches with the indigenous knowledge of present-day trackers from hunter-gatherer societies.

== Foundation ==
Tracking in Caves was organized as a joint project by the African Archaeology (at the Institute of Prehistoric Archaeology, University of Cologne), the Neanderthal Museum, the Heinrich-Barth-Institute, the Nyae Nyae Conservancy, the Kalahari Peoples Fund and the Association Louis Bégouën. Financial support came from the German Research Foundation Deutsche Forschungsgemeinschaft.

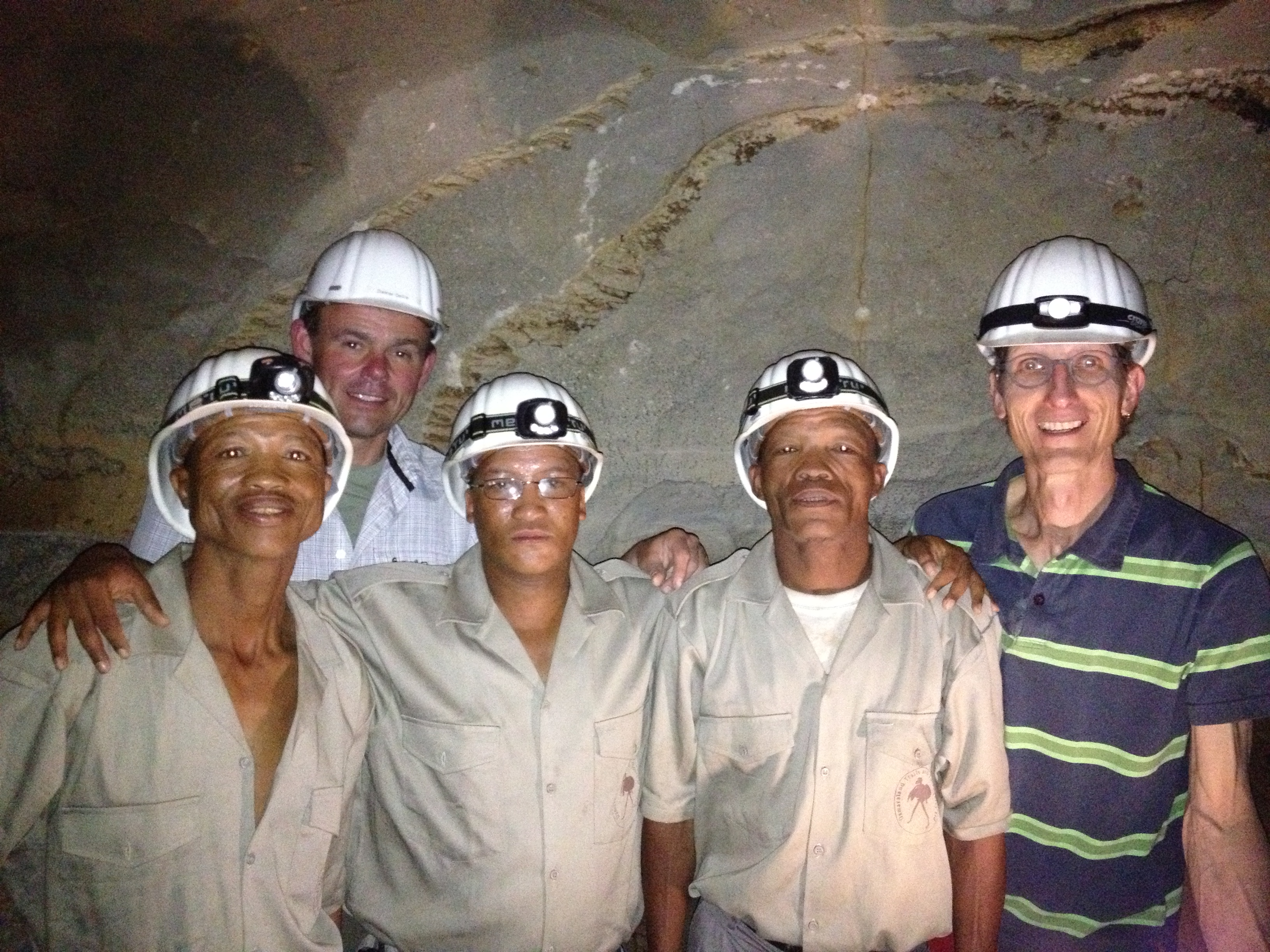
The core team in Ghaub Cave, Namibia

The numerous human footprints still preserved in some rock art caves in southern France were the starting point of the project. These tracks date back to the last Ice Age and originated around 17,000 years ago. In contrast to the rock art, they have so far only been sparsely studied and with purely morphometric, "surveying" approaches. In order to get a deeper understanding of these very individual human traces, two researchers, Tilman Lenssen-Erz (University of Cologne, African Archaeology), and Andreas Pastoors (Neanderthal Museum, Mettmann), invited African trackers to support them. Together with /Ui /Kxunta, /Ui G/aqo De!u and Tsamkxao Ciqae, three highly specialized trackers of the Ju/'hoansi San in Namibia, they investigated various caves in the French Pyrenees in the summer of 2013, including Niaux, Pech-Merle, Fontanet and Tuc d'Audoubert. In all the track fields that were investigated the three San experts were able to determine the age, sex, gait and occasional peculiarities (load, slipping, etc.) of most people who had moved there. Concluding statements on the prehistoric footprints were made after intensive discussion in the consensus of all three trackers. These conversations were recorded for further evaluation. The project was also accompanied by a film team and the resulting 90 minute TV documentary was broadcast on Arte TV on September 6, 2014. In addition to this documentary the project reached a far ranging public also in the following years in particular through media reports in newspapers and journals.

In 2014, with the support of AICON 3D Systems, the footprint field in Pech-Merle was scanned, which had been examined by the trackers the year before.

== Presentation of findings ==
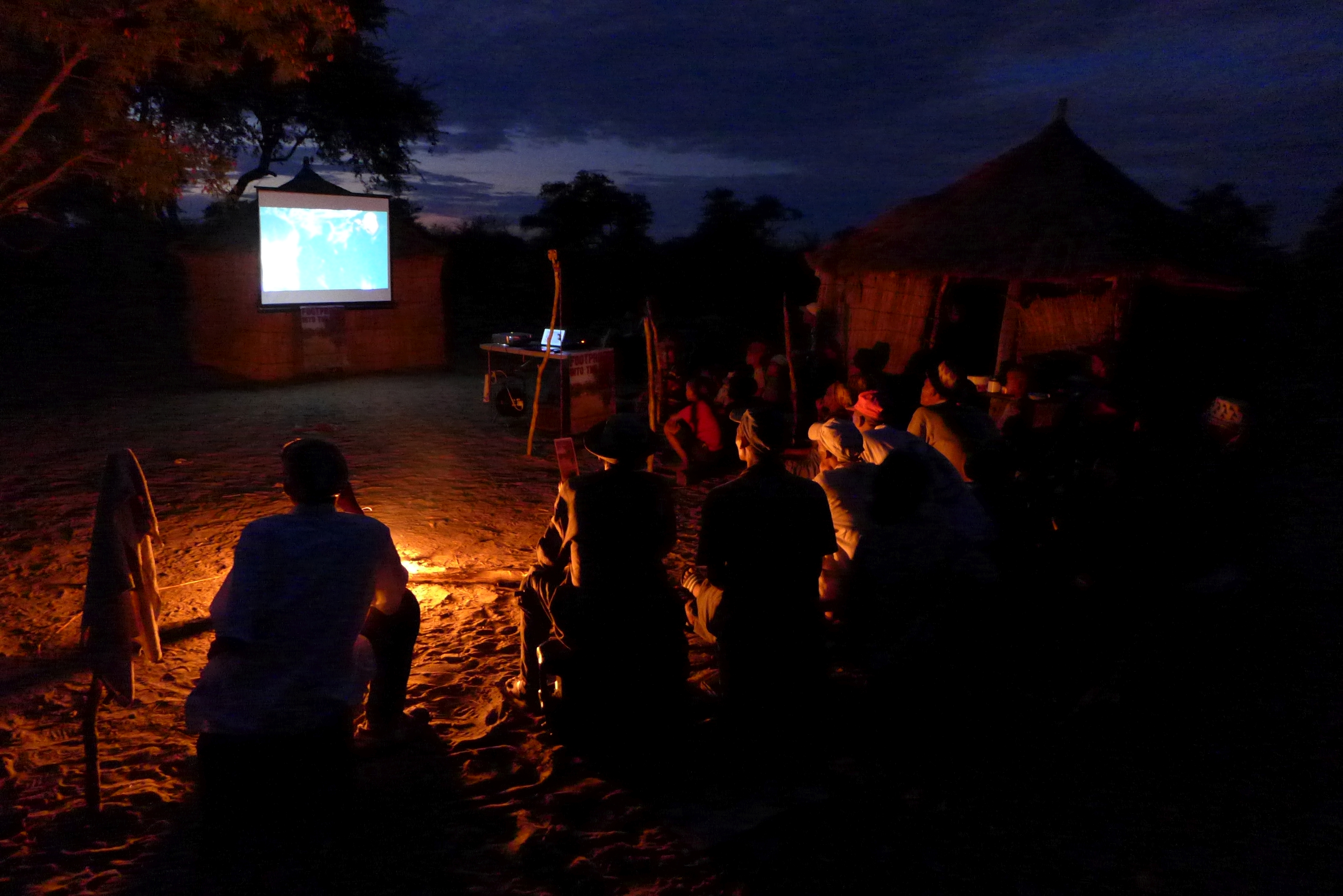
Showing the documentary to the community of Thui Thao in their village

In 2015, the core research team travelled back to Namibia, funded by the Andrea von Braun Stiftung. There the English dubbed version of the TV documentary was screened at the communities of the participant San trackers at various locations in Namibia and Botswana. On these occasions the three trackers took over the entire presentation (introduction, explanations and subsequent discussion) of the events. In addition to the "homecoming" of the results, an important element of these movie nights was the conveyance of the importance of the art of tracking based on the encyclopaedic ecological knowledge of the communities.

In order to bring together the very diverse approaches existing worldwide in the field of tracking and in scientific research on old tracks, an international conference is scheduled for Cologne and Mettmann (Neanderthal Museum) in May 2017. It allows an intensive exchange between scientists and trackers from different parts of the world, in order to bring together the wide and most diverse knowledge about prehistoric tracks and their interpretation. A wide range of indigenous knowledge is to be articulated through trackers from such diverse environments as arid tropical zones, rainforest and Arctic tundra.
