= Mettmann Zentrum station =

Railway station in Germany

Mettmann Zentrum
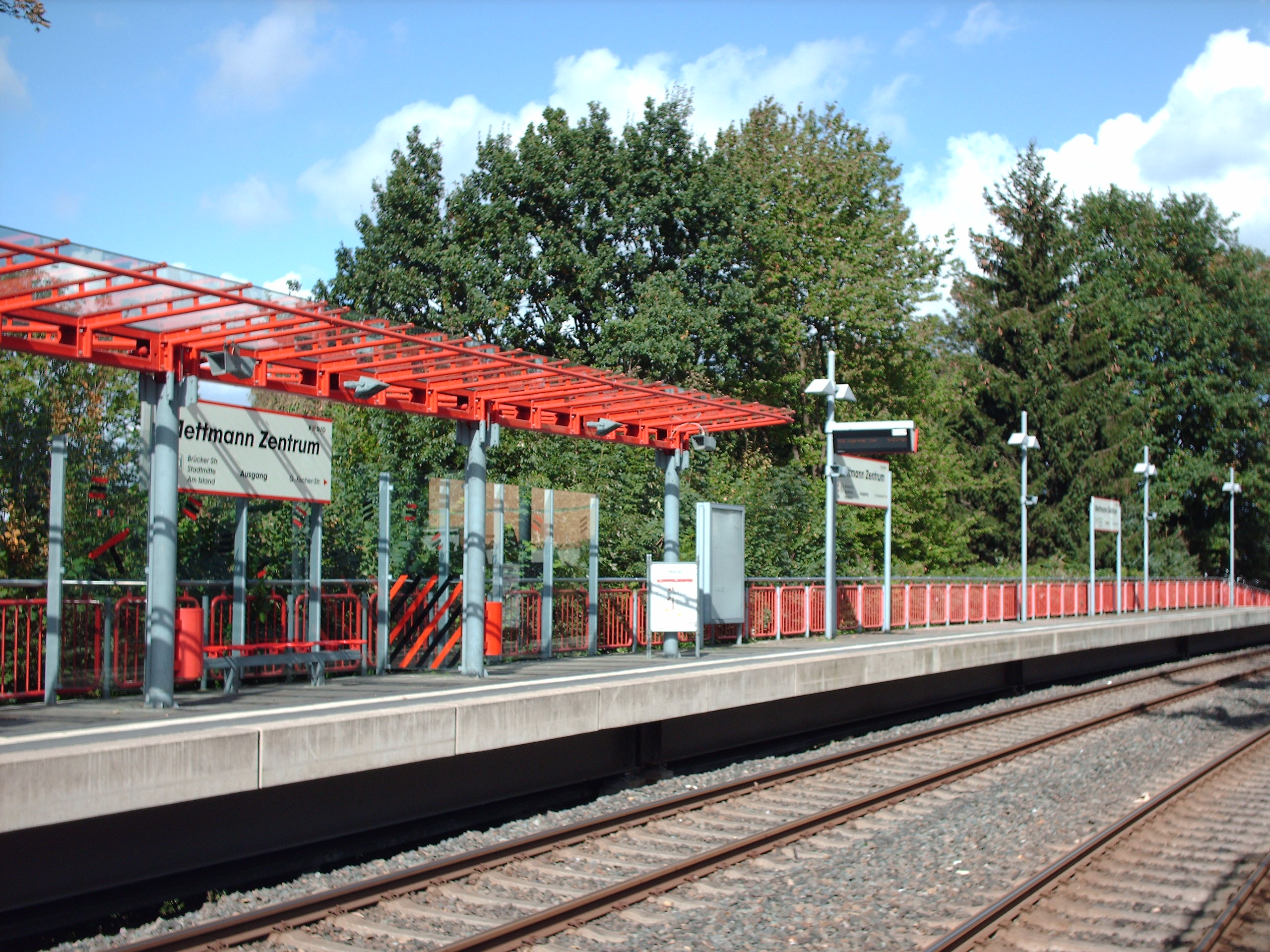

General information
- Location: Erkrath, North Rhine-Westphalia; Germany
- Coordinates: 51°14′55″N 6°58′48″E
- System: Through station
- Line: Düsseldorf–Mettmann S28
- Platforms: 2

Construction
- Accessible: Yes

Other information
- Station code: n/a
- DS100 code: KMEW
- Fare zone: VRR: 540
- Website: www.regiobahn.de

History
- Opened: 1953

Services
Preceding station	Rhine-Ruhr S-Bahn	Following station
Neanderthal towards Kaarster See	S28	Mettmann Stadtwald towards Wuppertal Hbf
Location

Mettmann Zentrum ("Mettmann centre") station is a Rhine-Ruhr S-Bahn station in the town of Mettmann in the German state of North Rhine-Westphalia. It was opened in 1953 on the last section of the Düsseldorf-Derendorf–Dortmund Süd railway from Mettmann station (now Mettmann Stadtwald station) to the Rhenish Railway Company's Düsseldorf station. It was opened in 1953 as Mettmann West station and given its current name on 26 September 1999.

The station is served by Rhine-Ruhr S-Bahn line S 28 at 20-minute intervals.

The station is served by 11 bus routes, SB68 (Dornap – Wieden – Wuppertal, every 60 minutes), O10 (Mettmann Süd – Stadtwald + Kaldenberg – Metzkausen, every 60 minutes), O11 (Metzkausen – Hasselbeckstr + Friedhof Lindenheide, every 60 minutes), O13 (Stadtwald + Danziger Str – Jubiläumsplatz, every 20 minutes), 738 (Gerresheim Krankenhaus – Dreherstr – Düsseldorf Hbf, every 20–60 minutes), 741 (Neanderthal – Hochdahl – Hilden – Südfriedhof, every 20–60 minutes), 742 (Gruiten – Haan – Thienhausen, every 20–60 minutes), 743 (Neanderthal – Erkrath, every 60 minutes), 745 (Dornap – Wieden – Vohwinkel, every 60 minutes), 745 (Dornap – Wieden – Wuppertal, every 60 minutes), 746 (Wülfrath – Tönisheide – Velbert, every 20 minutes) and 749 (Metzkausen – Ratingen – Kaiserswerth, every 60 minutes). All are operated by Rheinbahn or in conjunction with Kreisverkehrsgesellschaft Mettmann (741, 742, 743, 746 and 749).
