= Château de Cabrerets =

Castle in Occitania, France

Coordinates: 44.5042°N 1.6540°E

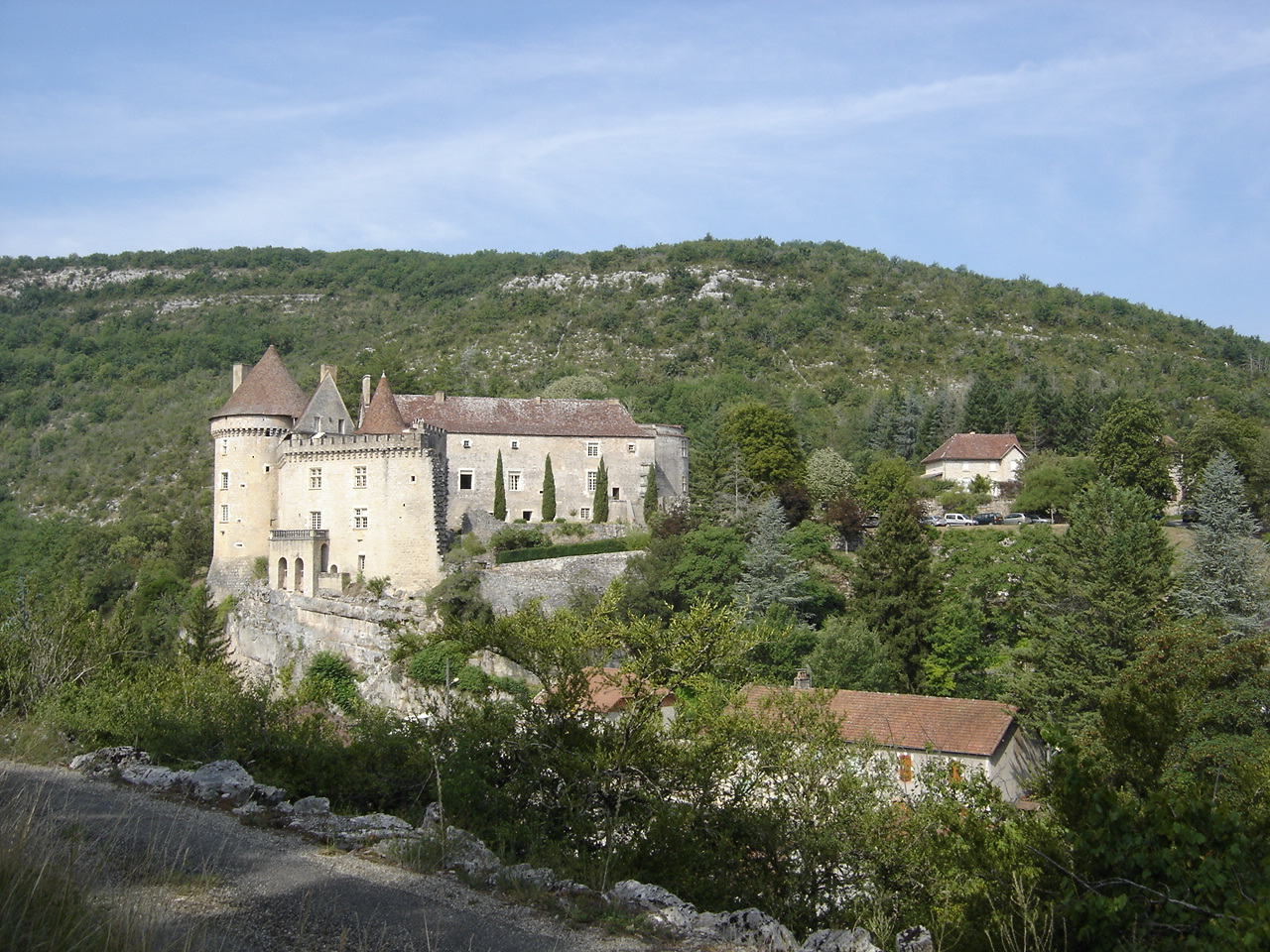
The Château de Cabrerets in 2006

The Château de Cabrerets is a castle in the commune of Cabrerets in the Lot département of France.

== History ==
The first castle was built in the thirteenth century, belonging to the Barasc family and from the second half of the 15th century to the Cardaillacs.

The current castle, whose buildings revolve around a large courtyard, was rebuilt in the sixteenth century by the Gontaut family, lords of Cabrerets. It belonged to the marshal-duke Charles de Gontaut-Biron, a friend of Henry IV and a traitor to that king.

Throughout the 18th century, the Gontauds did not reside in Quercy but in their castle of Biron in the Dordogne. Armand Louis de Gontaut, Duke of Lauzun and Lord of Cabrerets, was during the French Revolution deputy of Quercy in the States-General. Accused of conspiracy against the Republic, he was beheaded on 31 December 1793. His wife, Amélie, was guillotined a year later.

The castle was sold during the sale of national property. Joachim Murat, King of Naples, who had the Château de Labastide-Murat built for his mother, wanted to buy the Château de Cabrerets to give it to his brother André. His sister Antoinette Murat had married in 1784 Jean Bonafous, the owner of the Château de Crabillé who was then appointed aide-de-camp to Murat. The project was not followed up but Count Murat, deputy of the Lot, and members of his family gradually acquired the various shares of the castle and its estate around 1850 and undertook the restoration. The current owner, Philippe Sahut d'Izarn, is a descendant of this family.

It has been listed since 28 November 1996 as a monument historique by the French Ministry of Culture.

== See also ==
- List of castles in France
