= Cabrerets =

- Commune
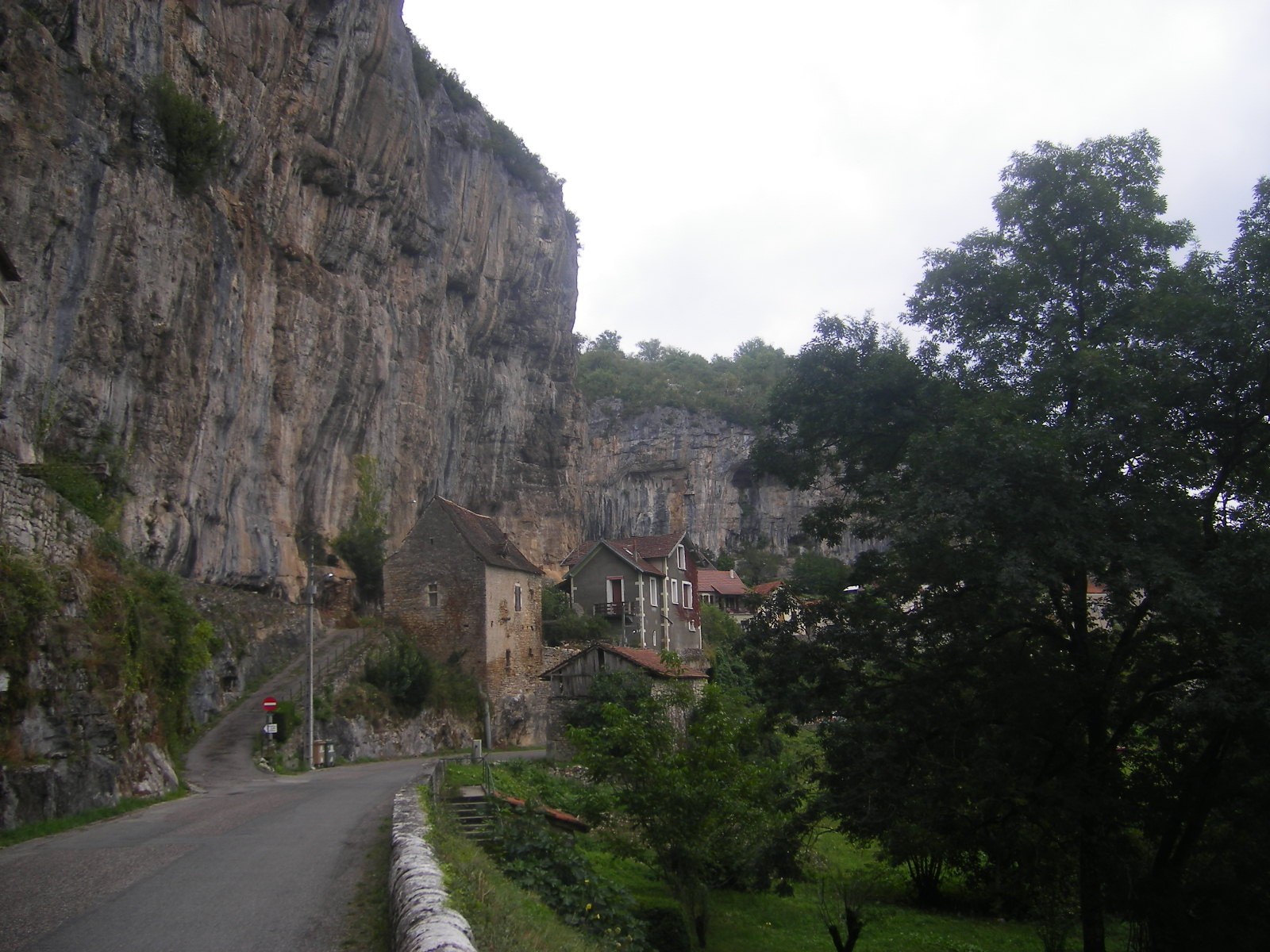
- Road to Cabrerets
- Location of Cabrerets
- Location within France Location within Occitanie
- Coordinates: 44°30′25″N 1°39′19″E
- Country: France
- Region: Occitania
- Department: Lot
- Arrondissement: Cahors
- Canton: Causse et Vallées
- Intercommunality: CA Grand Cahors

Government
  - Mayor (2020–2026): Marie-Laure Le Fourn
- Area^{1}: 43.38 km^{2} (16.75 sq mi)
- Elevation: 1,301 m (4,268 ft)
- Highest elevation: 367 m (1,204 ft)
- Lowest elevation: 130 m (430 ft)
- Population (2023): 220
  - Density: 5.1/km^{2} (13/sq mi)
- Time zone: UTC+01:00 (CET)
  - Summer (DST): UTC+02:00 (CEST)
- INSEE/Postal code: 46040 /46330
- ^{1} French Land Register data, which excludes lakes, ponds, glaciers > 1 km^{2} (0.386 sq mi or 247 acres) and river estuaries.

Cabrerets (French pronunciation: [kabʁəʁɛ]; Languedocien: Crabairet) is a commune in the Lot department in southwestern France.

The village of Cabrerets derives its name from cabre, meaning goat in the Occitan language.

== Population ==
Historical population
Year	Pop.	±% p.a.
1968	242	—
1975	236	−0.36%
1982	213	−1.45%
1990	191	−1.35%
1999	203	+0.68%
2007	231	+1.63%
2012	224	−0.61%
2017	229	+0.44%
2023	220	−0.67%
Source: INSEE

== Geography ==
The village lies at the confluence of the rivers Sagne and Célé, at the foot of the Rochecourbe cliffs. The village also forms part of the pilgrimage route for those travelling to Santiago de Compostela and is the final stop before Cahors.

== History ==
The overhanging cliffs that dominate the town are home to a ruined castle, built by the English known as the château du diable ("devil's castle"). The castle was first mentioned in a document dating from 1259, and was the medieval home of the lords of Barsac. In 1380, during the Hundred Years' War, it fell into the hands of a force of routiers from Aquitaine controlled by the English. It was liberated ten years later by Jean d'Hébrard, lord of Saint-Sulpice, who subsequently ordered its demolition.

The nearby Pech Merle cave is home to prehistoric cave paintings, being one of the few prehistoric sites in France which remain open to the general public.

The Château de Cabrerets has been listed since 1996 as a monument historique by the French Ministry of Culture. Construction began in the early years of the 16th century.

== See also ==
- Communes of the Lot department
