= Konrad Heresbach =

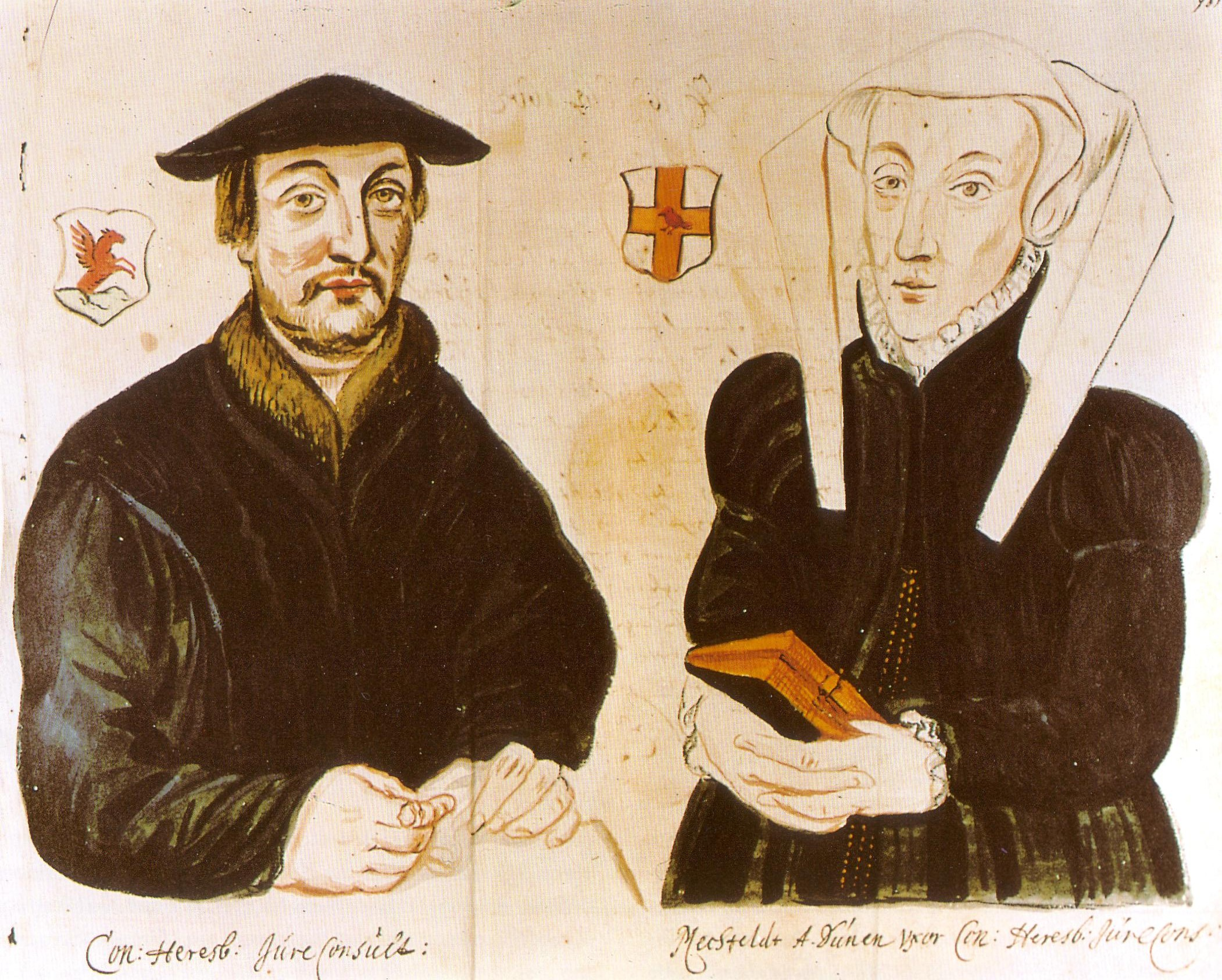
Konrad Heresbach and Mechthild van Duynen.

Konrad Heresbach (28 August 1496 – 14 October 1576) was a Rhenish Reformer, Calvinist, humanist and educator.

== Biography ==
Konrad or Conrad Heresbach was born at Manor Herzbach near Mettmann as the youngest of seven children to the wealthy holder of the Herzbach estate. In 1503, he left Mettmann to attend the Latin ecclesiastical school at the Benedictine Monastery at Werden. Here he became acquainted with the Latin language through reciting the biblical Psalms. Two years later he was schooled at the Latin school in Hamm, which provided children from the wealthy Rhenish–Markian bourgeois with an education. From 1510 onwards, he attended the cathedral school at Münster, and from 1512 the University of Cologne of liberal arts. Here he read Ancient Greek and Hebrew—graduating with the degree of magister artium. Thereafter, he pursued a degree in law in 1517.

At Cologne he became acquainted to the Dutch reformer Erasmus of Rotterdam, who after a brief stay at Paris and Orléans, found him a position at the University of Freiburg, where he graduated in 1522 with a doctorate in law. After some further Hebrew studies at the University of Padua at the age of 26 years, he returned to his native Duchy of Berg.

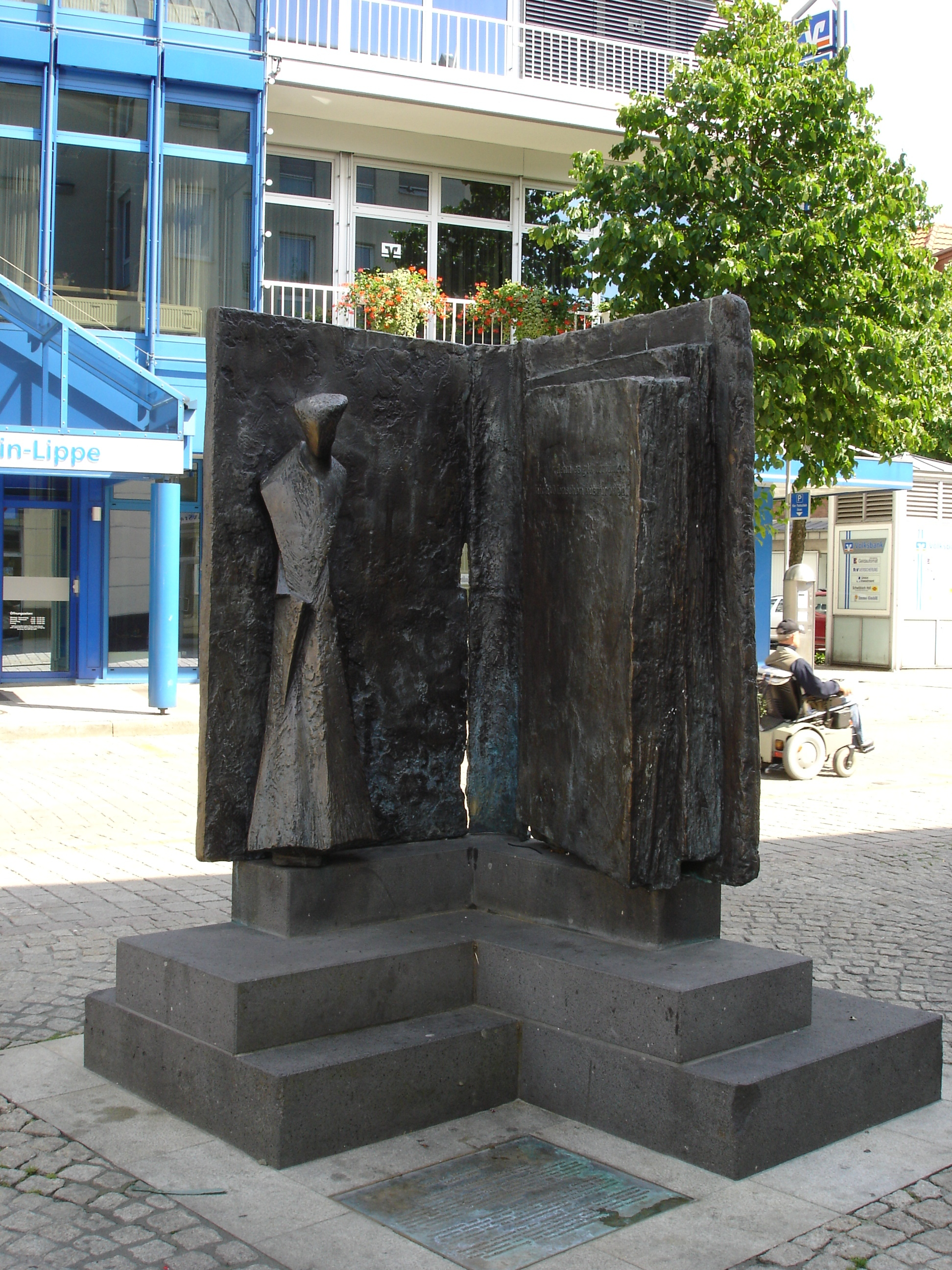
Memorial to Konrad Heresbach in Wesel.

Through Erasmus he gained a position as an educator with the dukes of Cleves at Wesel. He died at Manor Lorward near Wesel.

== Legacy ==
His educational teachings considerably influenced the philologist Konrad Duden, whose work was decisive for the standardization of the German Orthography.

== Works ==
- De Educandis Erudiendisque Principum Liberis, 1592 ( Frankfurt upon Main)
