= Cave of the Trois-Frères =

French cave famous for its rock paintings

- Grotte des Trois-Frères (French)
- Les Trois Frères
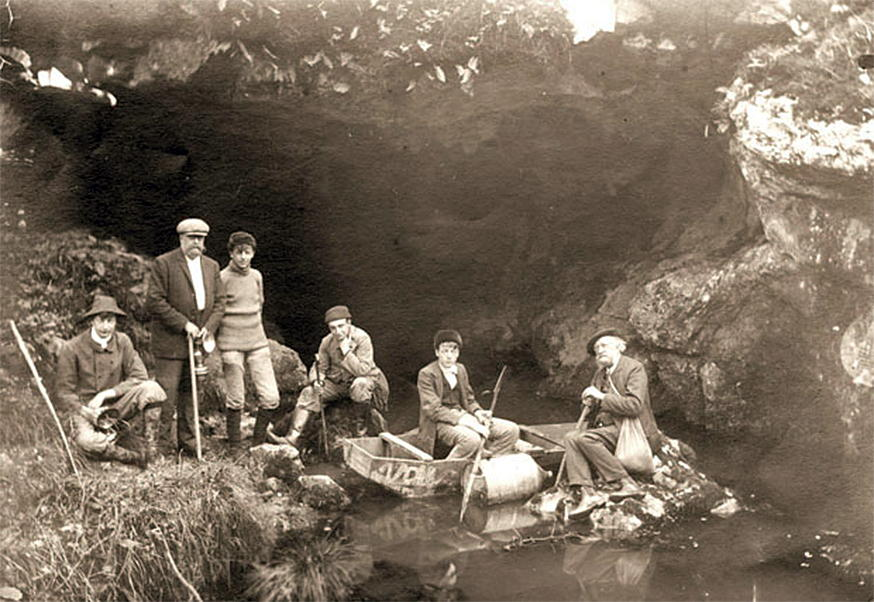
- Entrance to the Grotte du Tuc d'Audoubert, 1912

- Location in Occitania, France
- 43°1′52″N 1°12′30″E
- Type: limestone karst cave complex
- Cultures: Magdalenian
- Associated with: Paleolithic humans
- Location: Montesquieu-Avantes, Occitania, France
- Part of: Three cave-complex

History
- Built: c. 15,000 years ago

Site notes
- Archaeologists: Henri Breuil
- Discovered: 1912 by Max, Jacques, Louis, and Henri Begouën

The Cave of the Trois-Frères is a cave in southwestern France famous for its paintings. It is located in Montesquieu-Avantès, in the Ariège département. The cave is named for three brothers (French: trois frères, pronounced [tʁwɑ fʁɛʁ]), Max, Jacques, and Louis Begouën, who, along with their father, Henri Begouën, discovered it in 1912. The drawings in the cave were made famous in the publications of the archeologist Henri Breuil. The cave art appears to date to around 15,000 years ago.

== Artwork ==
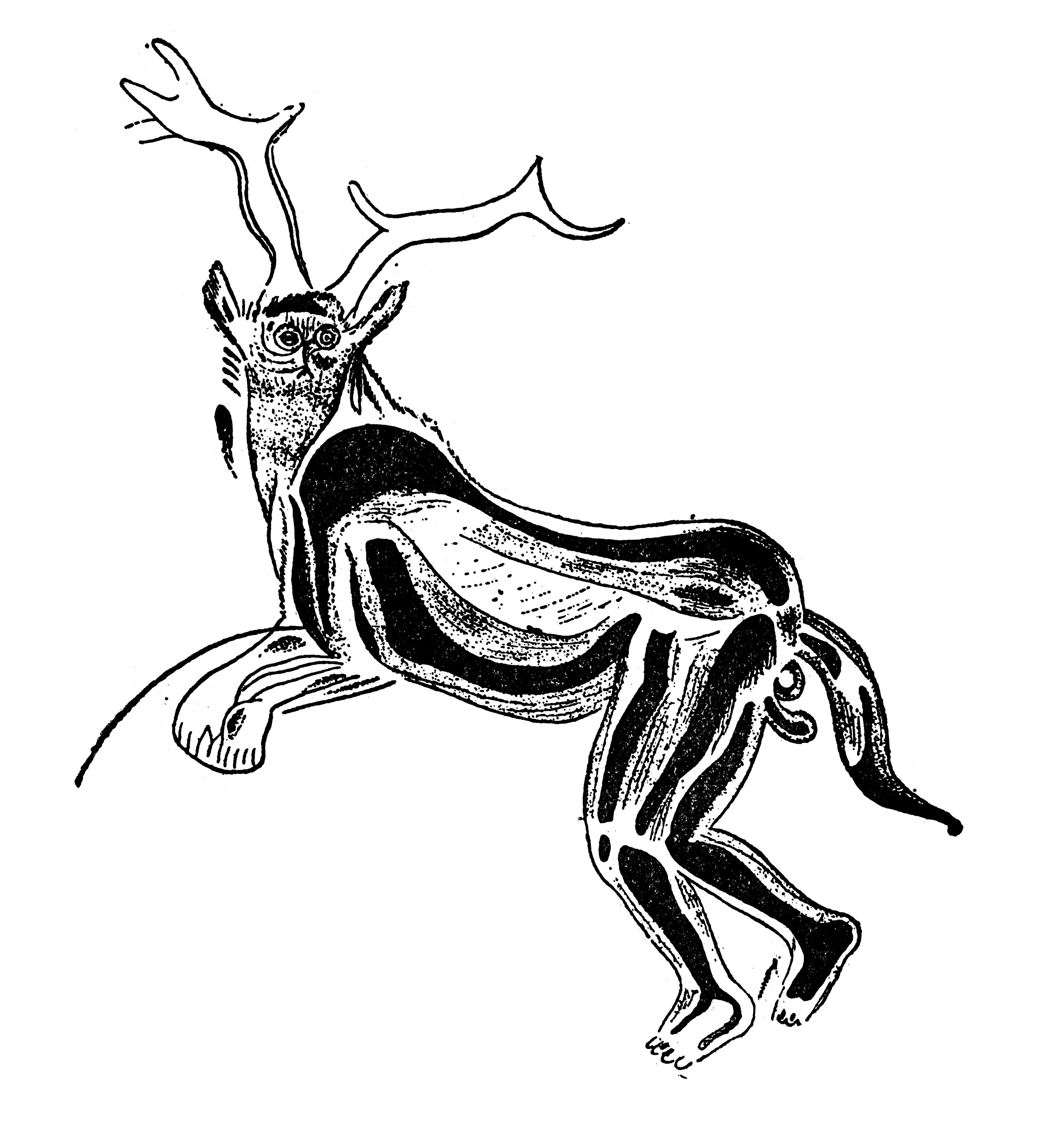
Sketch of Breuil's "The Sorcerer" drawing

One of the paintings, known as "the Sorcerer", is the "most famous and enigmatic human figure", with the features of several different animals, whose exact characteristics remain a matter of debate.

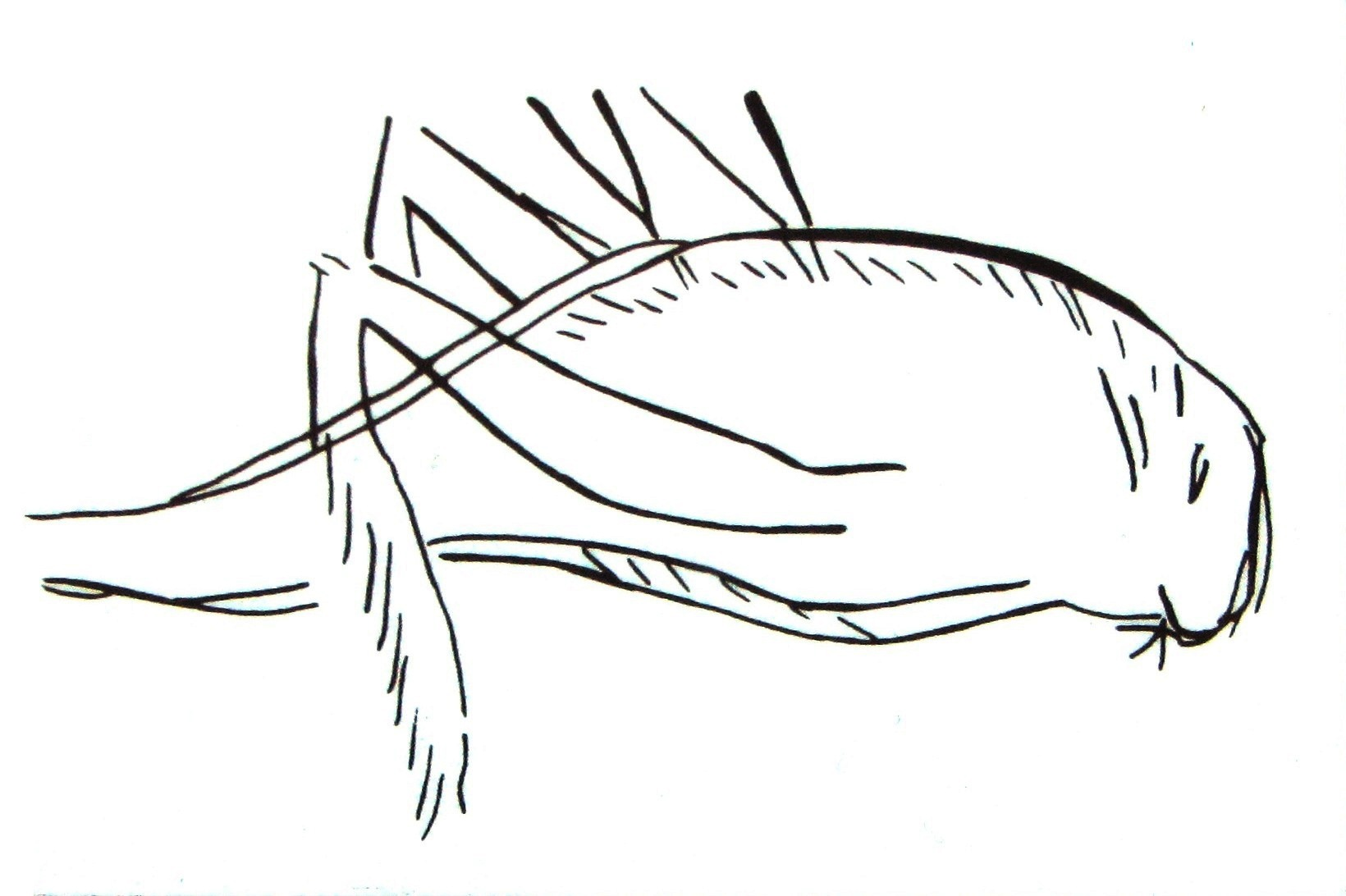
Drawing of the cave cricket engraving

Engravings featuring what appear to be several birds and a cave cricket were found on a fragment of bison bone at the junction of Trois-Frères with the Grotte d'Enlène. The cave cricket was portrayed with such fidelity that the insect's species has been determined; it is thought to be the earliest known representation of an insect.

A variety of engraved animals are found on the cave walls, including lions, owls, and bison. Of particular note is a horse overlaid with claviform (club-like) symbols and an apparently speared brown bear vomiting blood.

Aside from the "Sorcerer", other human-like figures can be seen at Trois-Frères, such as the man-bison, and a character known as the "small sorcerer", who appears to be playing a nose-flute. Also of interest is an etched representation of a 59 cm long phallus that follows the contours of the cave walls.

== Tuc d'Audoubert ==
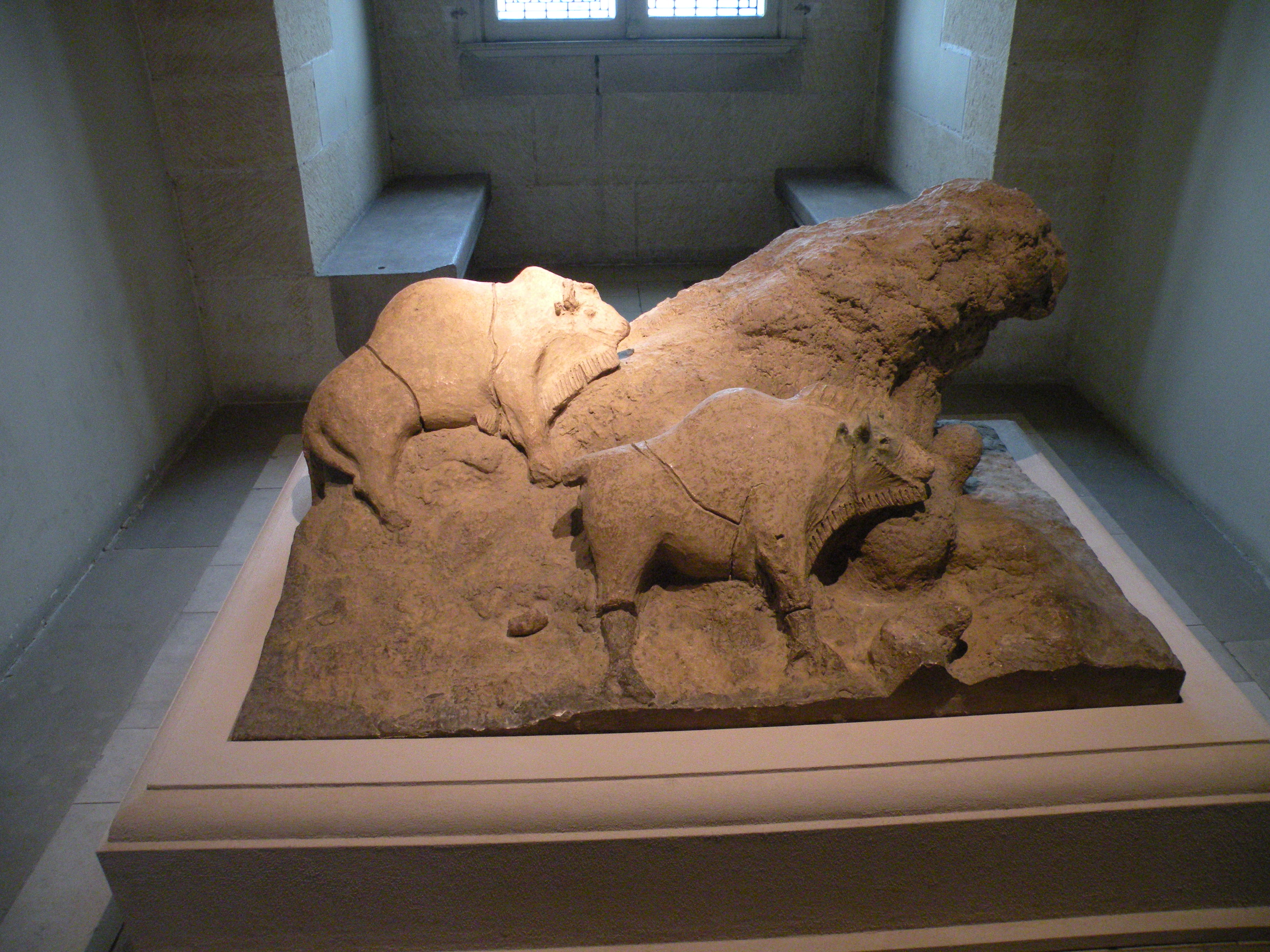
Clay-sculpted bison from Trois Frères (facsimile)

The Trois-Freres cave is part of a single cave complex formed by the Volp River. The complex is divided into three caves: the central Trois-Freres, Enlène (French pronunciation: [ɑ̃lɛn]) to the east, and the Tuc d'Audoubert (pronounced [tyk dodubɛʁ]) to the west.

The Tuc d'Audoubert was discovered by the three teenage brothers in 1912. The galleries are situated on three levels; the river Volp flows through the lowest, the middle contains decorated galleries known as the La Salle Nuptiale ("the bridal room") and La Galerie des Gravures ("the gallery of engravings"), while the upper has further decoration in La Chatière and Salle des Talons ("hall of claws") and finishes in the Salle des Bisons ("hall of bisons"). In 2013, the Tracking in Caves project tested experience-based reading of prehistoric footprints by specialised trackers of Ju/'hoansi San with great success.

The Salle des Bisons contains two masterfully modeled bison, which were sculpted in clay with a stone spatula-like tool and the artist's fingers. The pair are among the largest and finest surviving prehistoric sculptures.
