= Pech Merle =

Cave and archaeological site in France

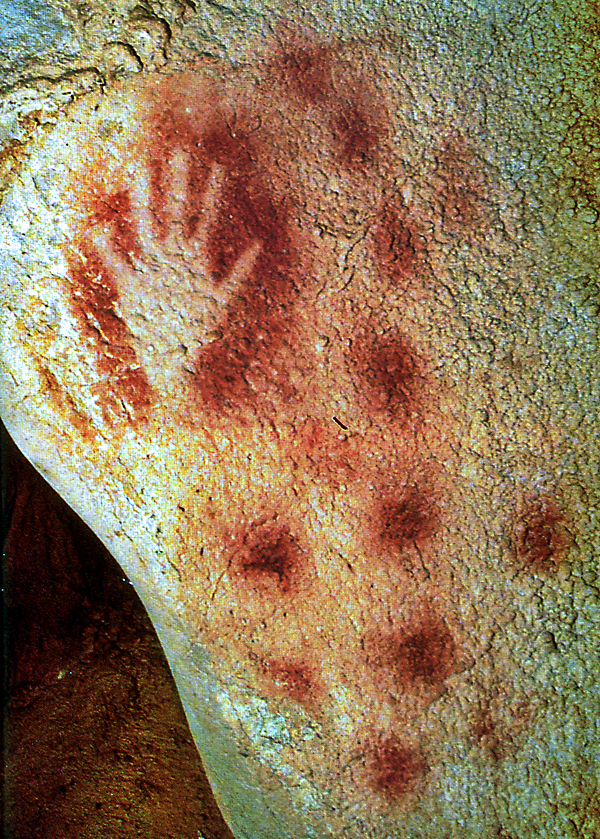
- Prehistoric cave art

- Location within France
- Location: Lot Department, Midi-Pyrénées, France
- Coordinates: 44°30′27″N 1°38′40″E

Pech Merle is a French hillside cave at Cabrerets, in the Lot département of the Occitania region, about 32 kilometres (19.88 miles) east of Cahors, by road. It is one of the few prehistoric cave painting sites in France that remains open to the general public, albeit with an entry fee. Encompassing two levels and spanning over 2 km (1.24 mi) in area—of which only 1,200 m (3,900 ft) are open to the public—are caverns, wells and sloping tunnels, the walls of which are painted with dramatic, prehistoric murals dating from the Gravettian culture (some 25,000 years BC). But some of the paintings and engravings may date from the later Magdalenian era (16,000 years BC).

The cave itself was created over 2 MYA by an underground river, cutting channels which were later used by humans for shelter and, eventually, for hand-painting the walls. The galleries are, today, mostly dry. Passageways and caverns accessible to visitors measure roughly 10m (33') across, on average; the clearance beneath the vault is between 5m-10m (16–32') high.

The cave art located in the deeper areas of the cave was discovered in 1922 by Marthe David (aged 13), together with her brother, André David (16), and Henri Dutetre (15). The three had previously been exploring the cave for a two-year period. Like other children of the area, these three had been encouraged and assisted in their exploration by Father Amedee Lemozi, the curate of Cabrerets and an amateur archaeologist, who had discovered other cave paintings in the region.

The walls of seven of the chambers at Pech Merle have recent-looking, lifelike images of mammoths, spotted and single-coloured equids, bovids, reindeer, human stenciled handprints, and some human figures, as well. Footprints of children, preserved in what was once clay, have been found more than 800 m (2,600 ft) underground. In 2013, the project Tracking in Caves tested experience-based readings of prehistoric footprints by specialised trackers of Ju/'hoansi San, with great success. Within a 10 km (6.2 mi) radius of the site are ten other caves with prehistoric art from the Upper Palaeolithic period, but none of these are open to the public.

During the Ice Age, the caves were very likely used as places of refuge by prehistoric peoples, as the area had a distinctly more arctic, frigid climate, with harsh winters and more plentiful, larger animal species than those of modern-day France. It is speculated that, at one point, erosion or flooding caused a buildup of rainwater to flow into the cave, causing mudslides that had filled part of the entry to the cave in heavy sediment, effectively keeping it preserved until its discovery in the 20th century.

Experimental reconstruction work by French archaeologist Michel Lorblanchet has suggested that the application of the paint for some of the paintings was probably by means of a delicate spitting technique.

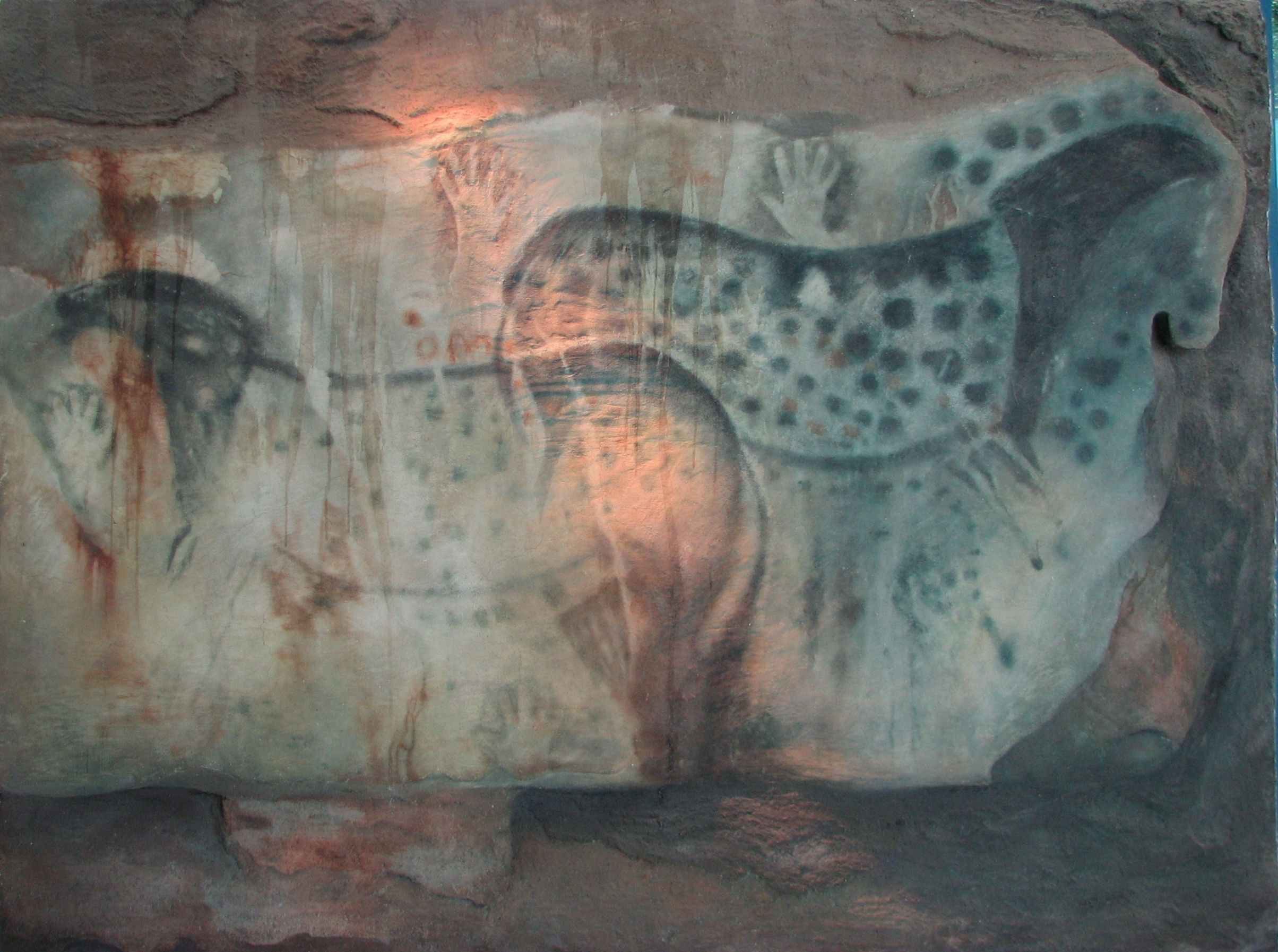
Replica of horses and hands cave painting displayed in the Brno museum

The cave at Pech Merle has been open to the public since 1926. Visiting groups are limited in size and number so as not to destroy the delicate artwork with the excessive humidity, heat and carbon dioxide produced by breathing.

== Dapple horses of Pech Merle ==
The paintings "Dappled Horses of Pech Merle", approximately 25,000 years old, depict spotted horses that look remarkably similar to the leopard pattern common in modern Appaloosas. Archaeologists have debated whether the artists were painting real horses they had observed or whether the spotting had some symbolic meaning. A 2011 study using the DNA of ancient horses, found that the leopard complex, which is involved in leopard spotting, was present, and concluded that the cave painters most likely did see real spotted horses. However later studies disputed this, claiming that the images "are at least 10,000 years older than even the oldest horses studied in the DNA search for “leopard spotting”."

== Prehistoric signatures of Pech Merle ==
A well-preserved image of a hand was also found in the cave. The "signature" is approximately 18,000 years BC. According to the thinner wrist, it is probably a female hand. Depictions of hands have been discovered in many prehistoric caves. The painter put her hand on the wall and sprayed it with paint.
