= Johannes Flintrop =

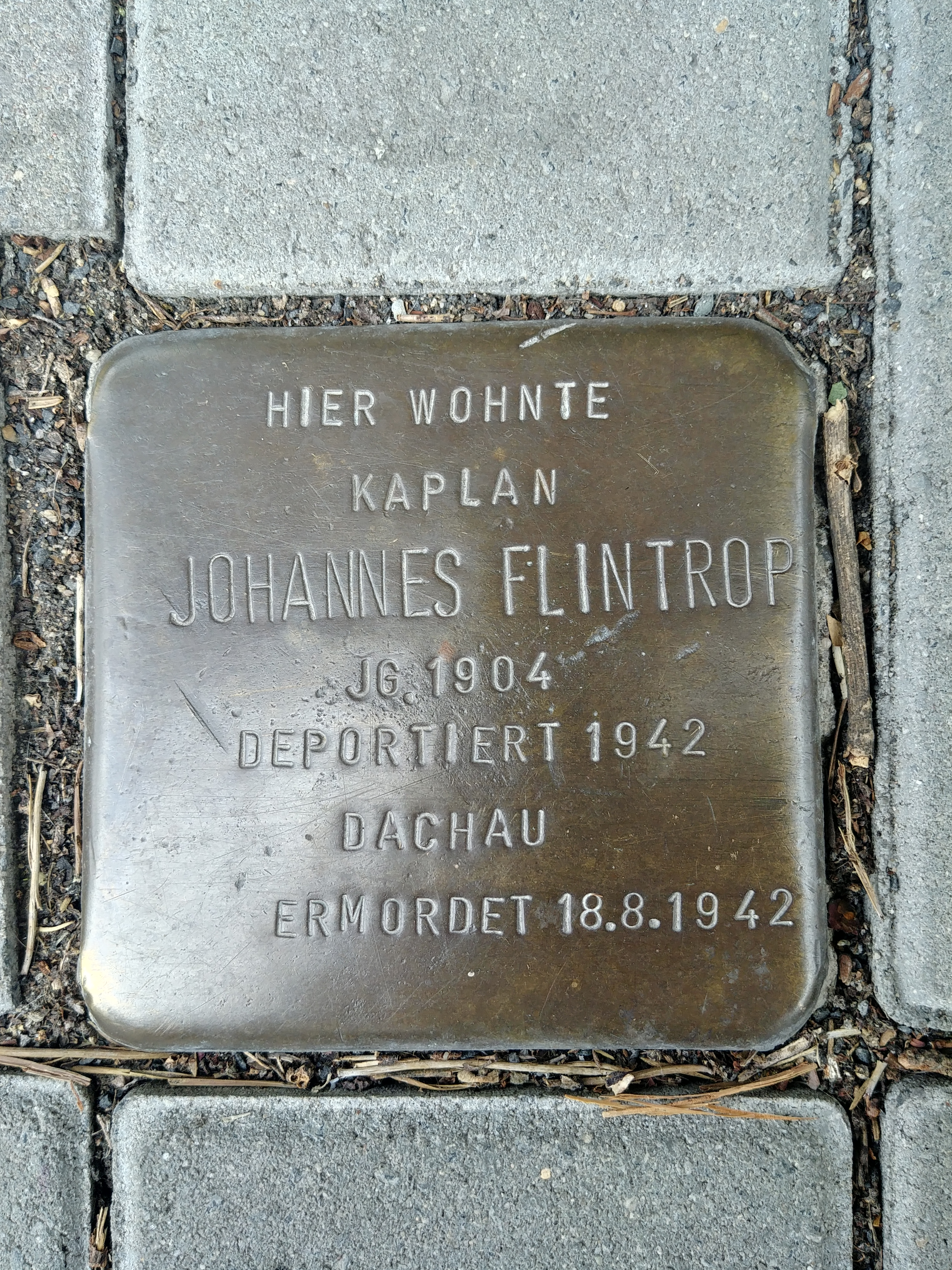
A Stolperstein commemorating Johannes Flintrop

Johannes Flintrop (May 23, 1904 – August 28, 1943) was a prominent Roman Catholic critic of the Nazi Party who died in the Dachau concentration camp.

== Biography ==
Flintrop was born in Barmen (Wuppertal) to devout working class parents. After his theological studies at the University of Münster, he was ordained a Pastor in Cologne in 1927. At the age of 23, he initially served the congregation Heart of Jesus in Cologne Mülheim, before becoming a vicar general to the congregation of St. Lambert at Mettmann in 1933.

In 1941, he admitted to youth of the Catholic Kolping workers society that the war had long not been won, and that "it is likely that we (German troops) too committed war atrocities" in the Soviet Union. For this he was imprisoned in Düsseldorf, from where he was transferred to the concentration camp at Dachau on May 1, 1942. He died on August 28, 1943, officially of unknown causes. Surviving inmates of the concentration camp reported that he was forcefully subjected to medical experiments and died as a result of them. He was cremated and buried in his hometown of Barmen by the congregation of St.Lambert in 1943. After the war, a main thoroughfare was named in his honor.
