= Volp =

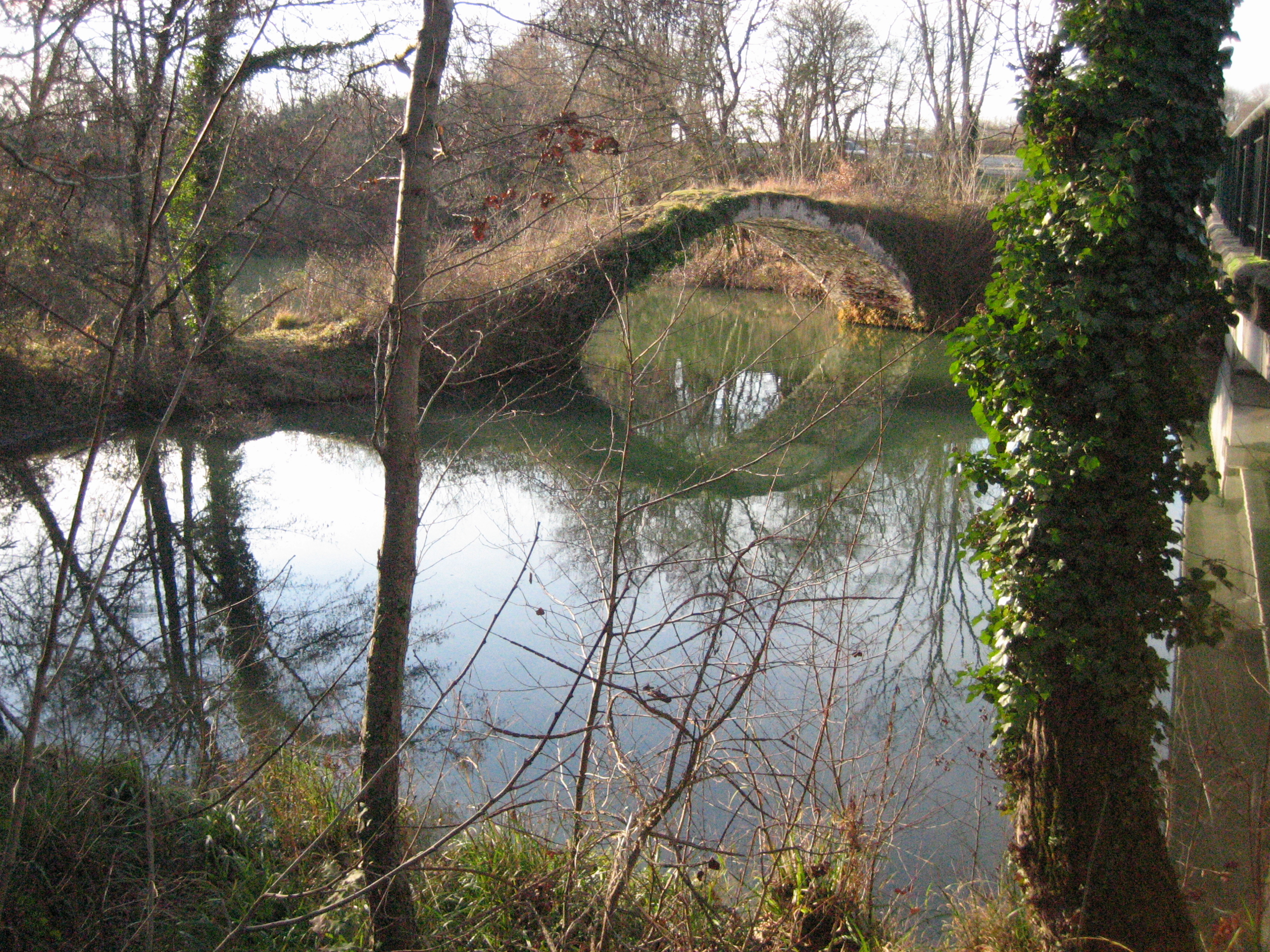
- The "Devil's Bridge"

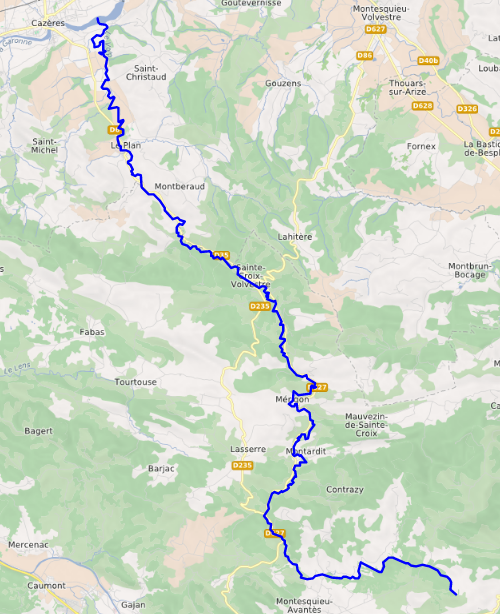

Location
- Country: France

Physical characteristics
- Mouth: Garonne
  - coordinates: 43°12′19″N 1°06′37″E
- Length: 40.3 km (25.0 mi)

Basin features
- Progression: Garonne→ Gironde estuary→ Atlantic Ocean

The Volp is a 40-kilometre-long (25 mi) river of southwestern France. It is a right tributary of the Garonne, which it joins upstream of Cazères, Haute-Garonne. A flood in 1993 ruined a marginal amount of cropland.

In 1912 ice-age cave paintings were discovered in a cave along the length of the Volp. See Trois Frères.

Notable places along the river include:

- Ariège: Sainte-Croix-Volvestre
- Haute-Garonne: Le Plan
