= Neanderthal Museum =

Museum in Mettmann, Germany

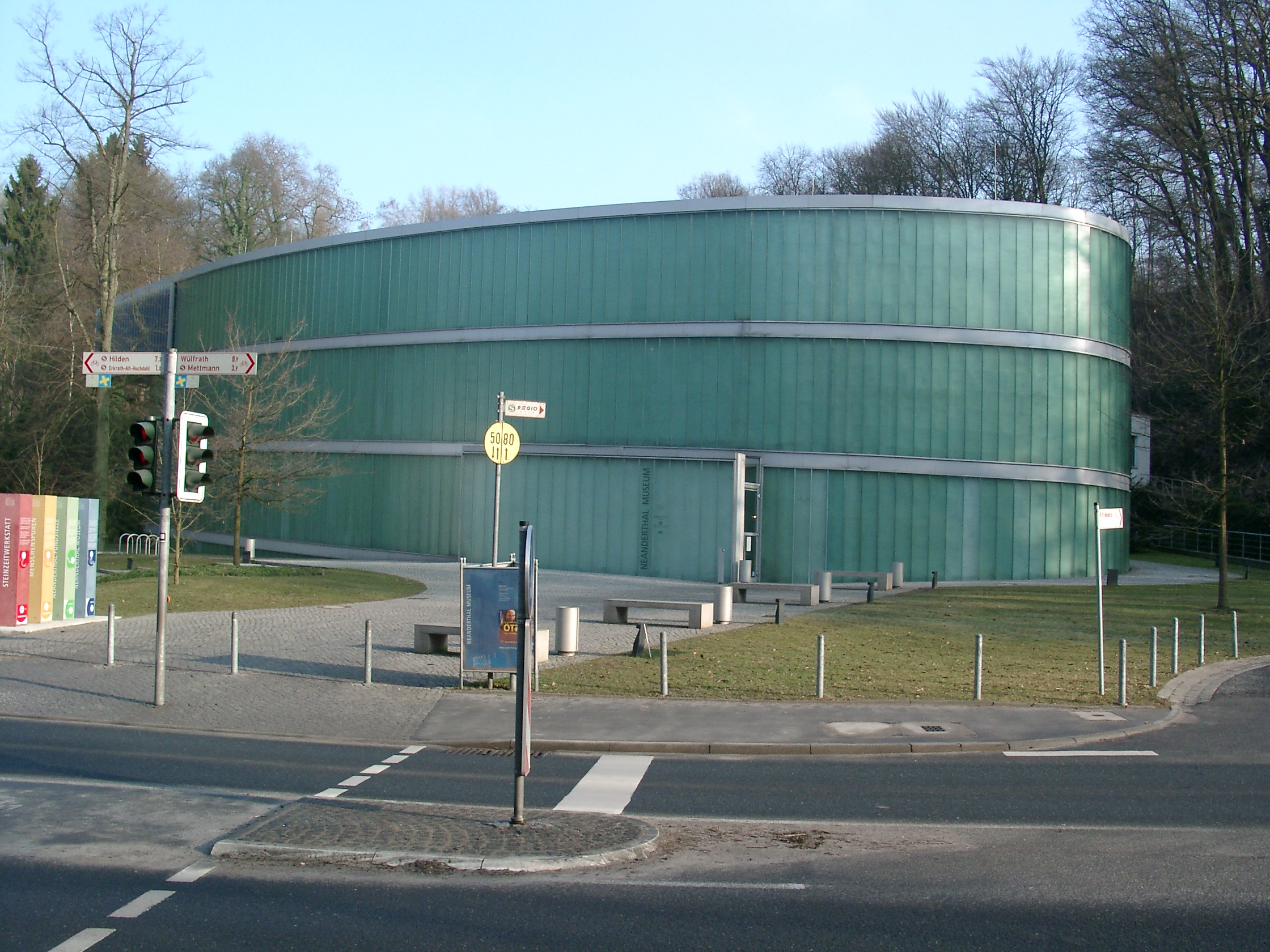
- Neanderthal Museum

- Location of Neanderthals Museum in Mettmann, Germany Neanderthal Museum (Germany)
- Established: 1996
- Location: Mettmann, Germany
- Coordinates: 51.2269°N 6.9505°E
- Type: Anthropological
- Visitors: 170,000
- Website: Neanderthal Museum

The Neanderthal Museum is a museum in Mettmann, Germany. It was established in 1996. Located at the site of the first Neanderthal man discovery in the Neandertal, it features an exhibit centered on human evolution. The museum was constructed in 1996 to a design by the architects Zamp Kelp, Julius Krauss and Arno Brandlhuber and draws about 170,000 visitors per year. It includes an archaeological park on the original discovery site, a Stone Age workshop, as well as an art trail named "human traces".

== History ==
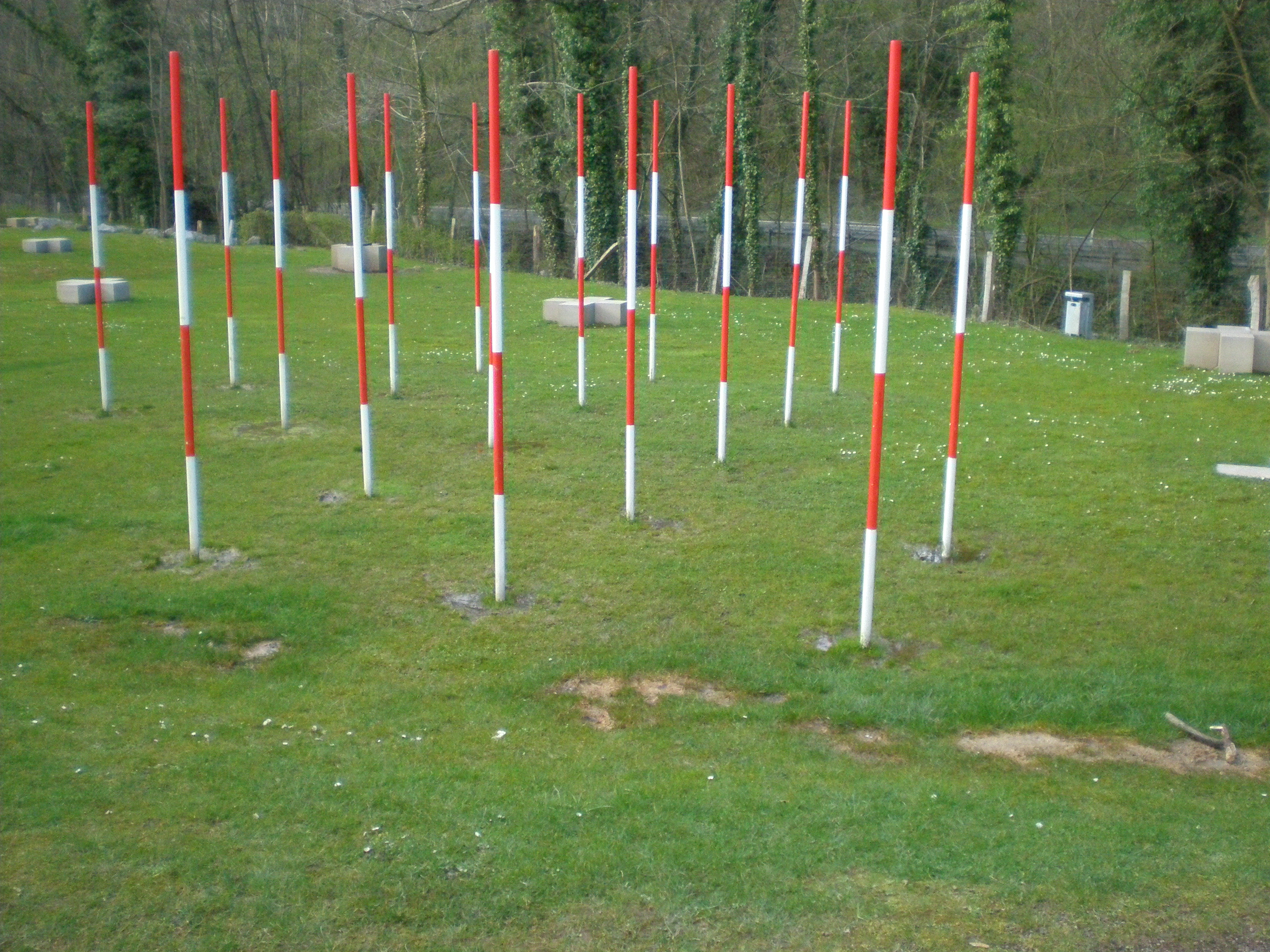
The site located east of Erkrath where the Neanderthal type specimen was excavated by miners in the 19th century in Germany, now maintained by the Neanderthal Museum

The architectural plan for the museum was chosen through a competition held in the spring of 1993 in which 130 participants from Germany and other countries participated. The design submitted by Professor Günter Zamp Kelp, Julius Krauss and Arno Brandlhuber was chosen as it represented the importance of the location. The museum was established on 10 October 1996 near the site where the renowned Neanderthal fossil was found. Its multimedia exhibition was upgraded in 2006. Continuing donations, endowment or testamentary of funding help further development of the museum and for acquisition of many more exhibits. The former hotel Neanderthaler Hof was demolished to make room for the museum's extension.

== Exhibits ==
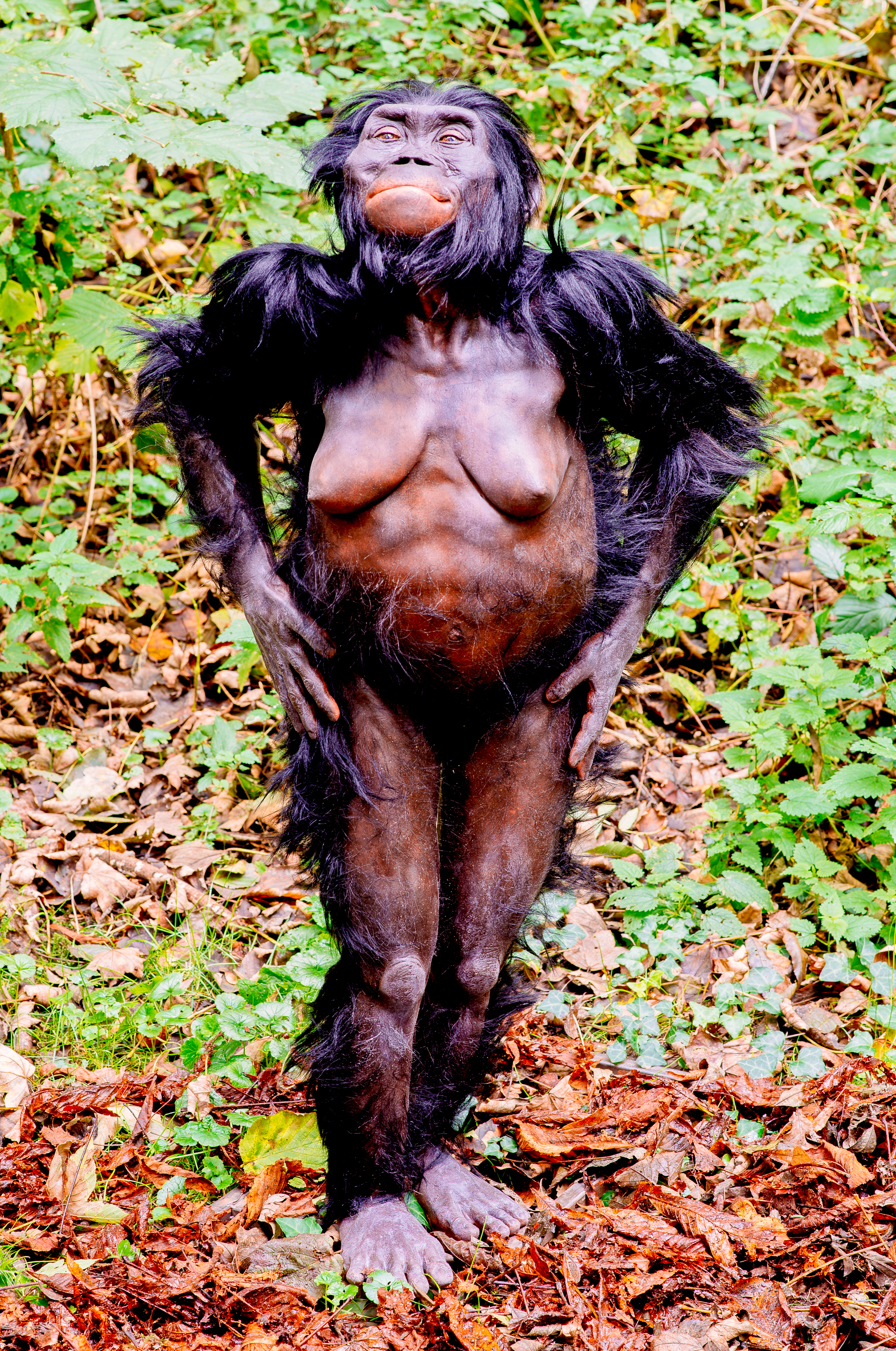
Reconstruction of Lucy, an Australopithecus afarensis, at the museum

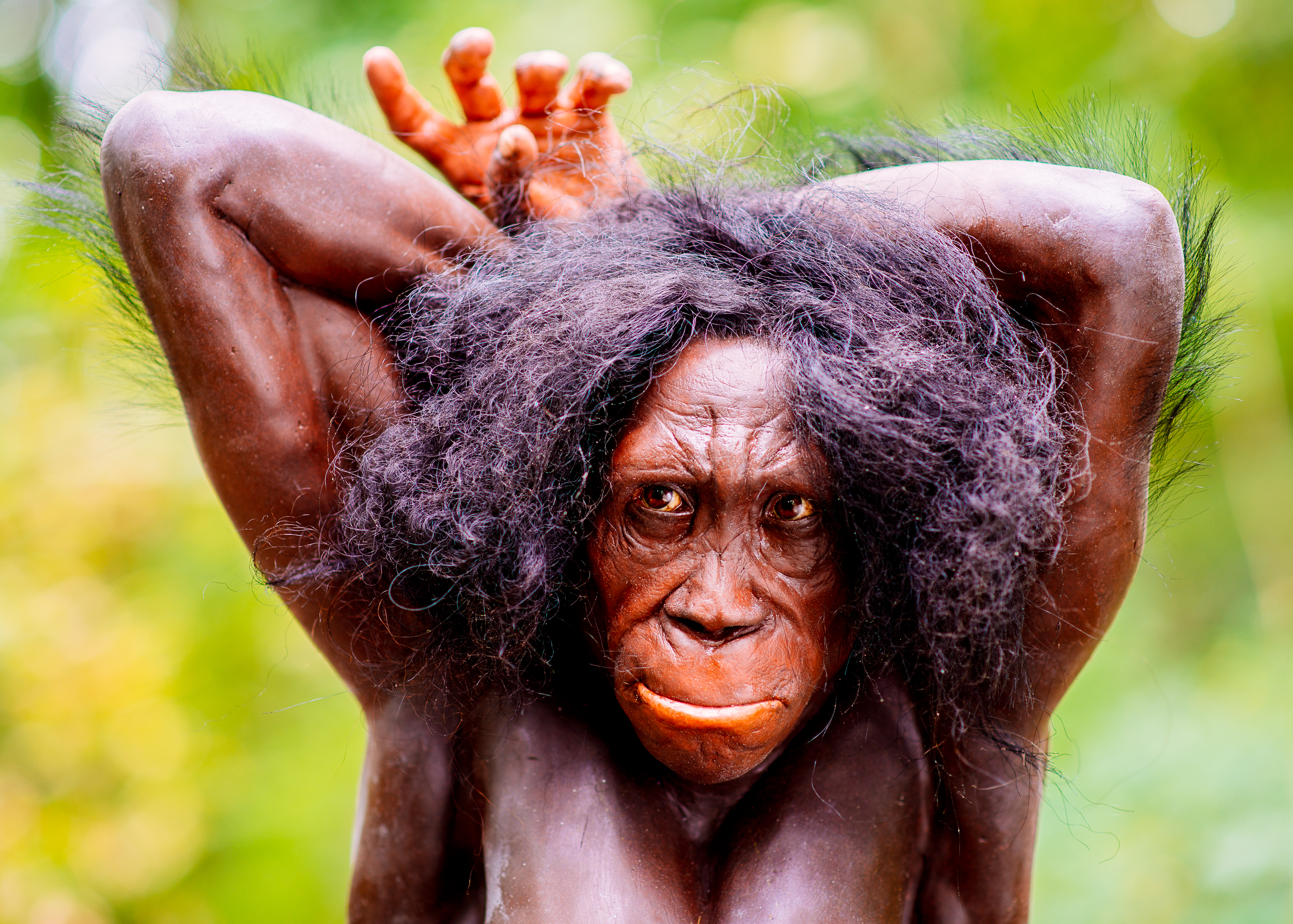
Reconstruction of a largely hairless male Australopithecus sediba by Adrie and Alfons Kennis at the museum

The museum gives a background of the story of humanity, from its beginnings in the African savannas to the sprawling global cities of modern day, with particular emphasis on Neanderthals. Their exhibited life-size reconstructions of various archaic human species are based on fossils excavated from archaeological sites. The exhibits are displayed on four floors of the building, connected through a spiraling ramp. In the first section, there are exhibits on the history of the Neander Valley named "A valley and its Secret", which cover the relics relating to the original skeleton discovery in the valley. The next exhibit, “A journey through time”, is about major stages of human history. Based on the main theme of "Evolution of Humankind", the next exhibit is divided into five sections: "Life and Survival", "Tools and Knowledge", "Myth and Religion", "Environment and Nourishment" and "Communication and Society".

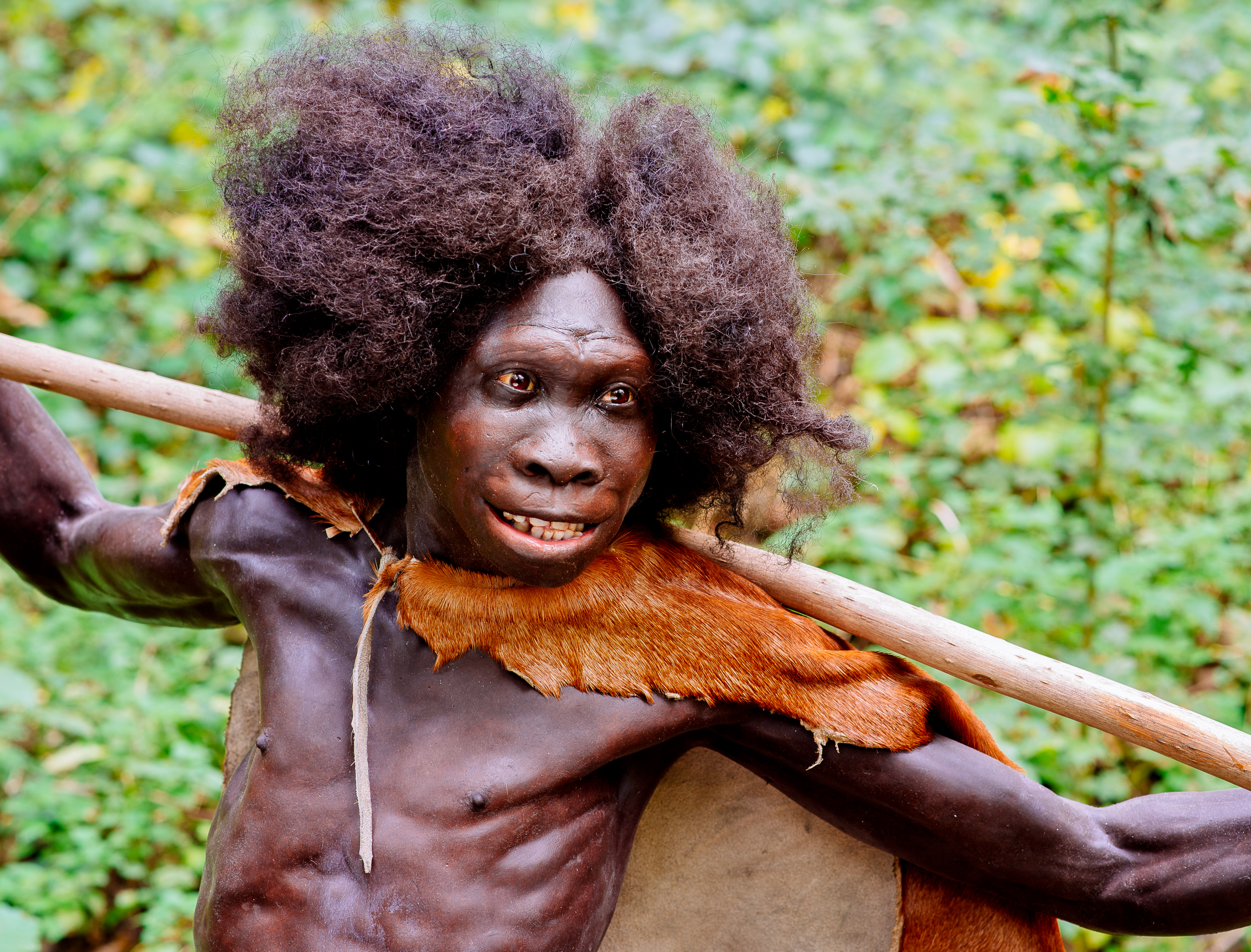
Reconstruction of Turkana Boy, a Homo erectus, at the museum

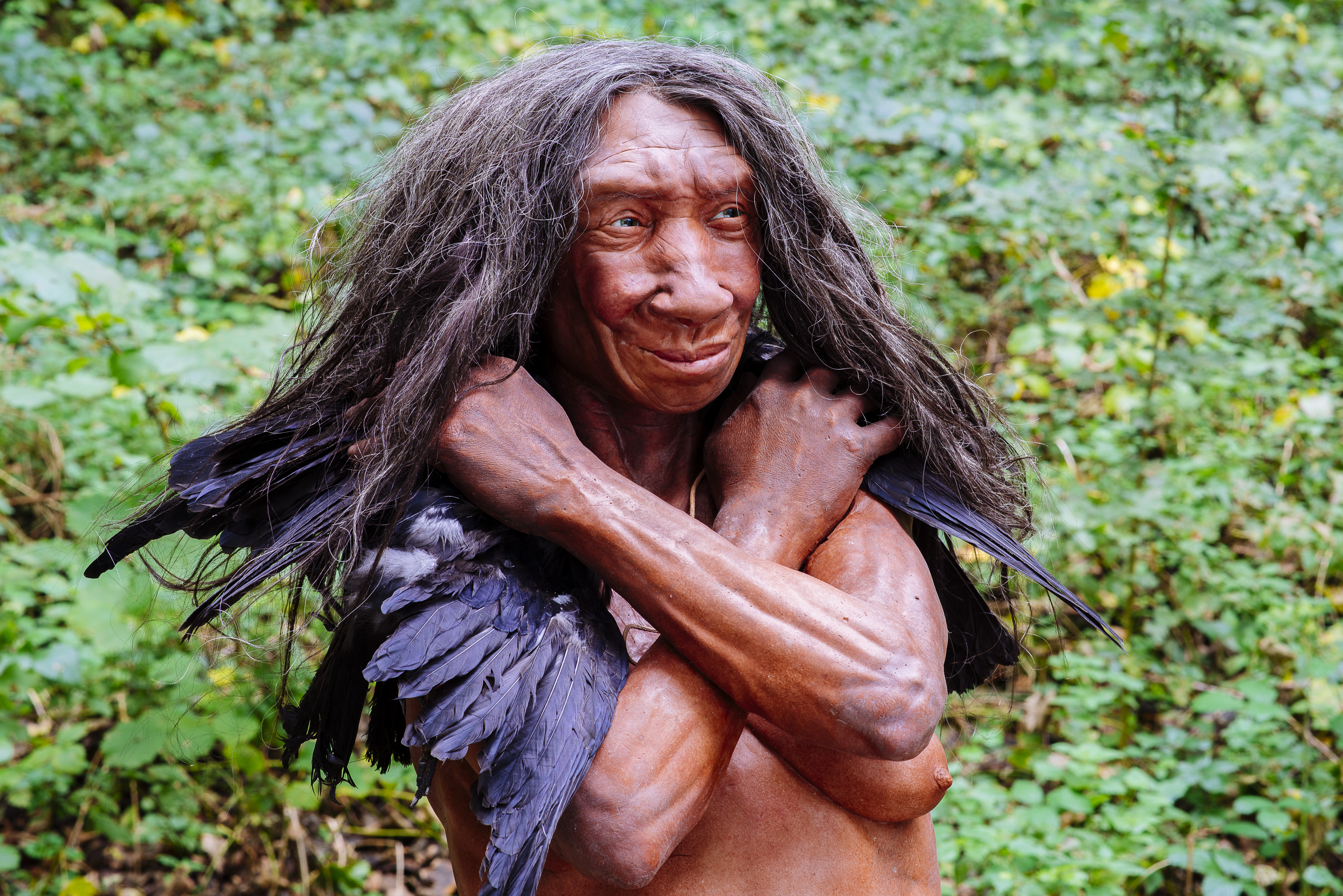
Reconstruction of a Neanderthal from Gibraltar at the museum

The museum has a unique collection of casts of the original human fossils which represent the evolution of the hominids in general, and that of the Neanderthals in particular. This collection, prepared on the basis of finds from various excavated sites in the world, was facilitated by donations by Alfred Krupp von Bohlen and Halbach Foundation.

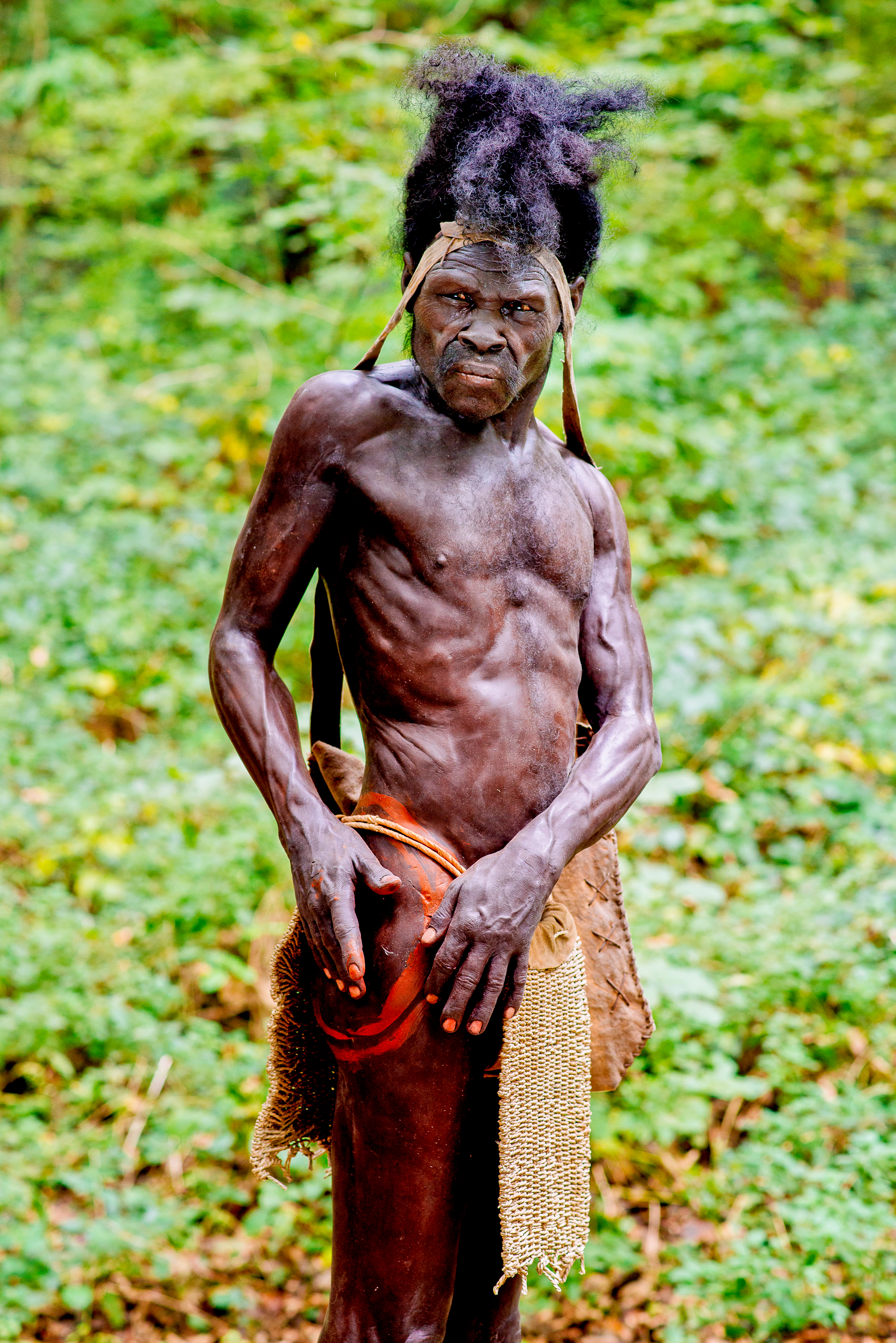
Reconstruction of an early Homo sapiens from Jebel Irhoud at the museum

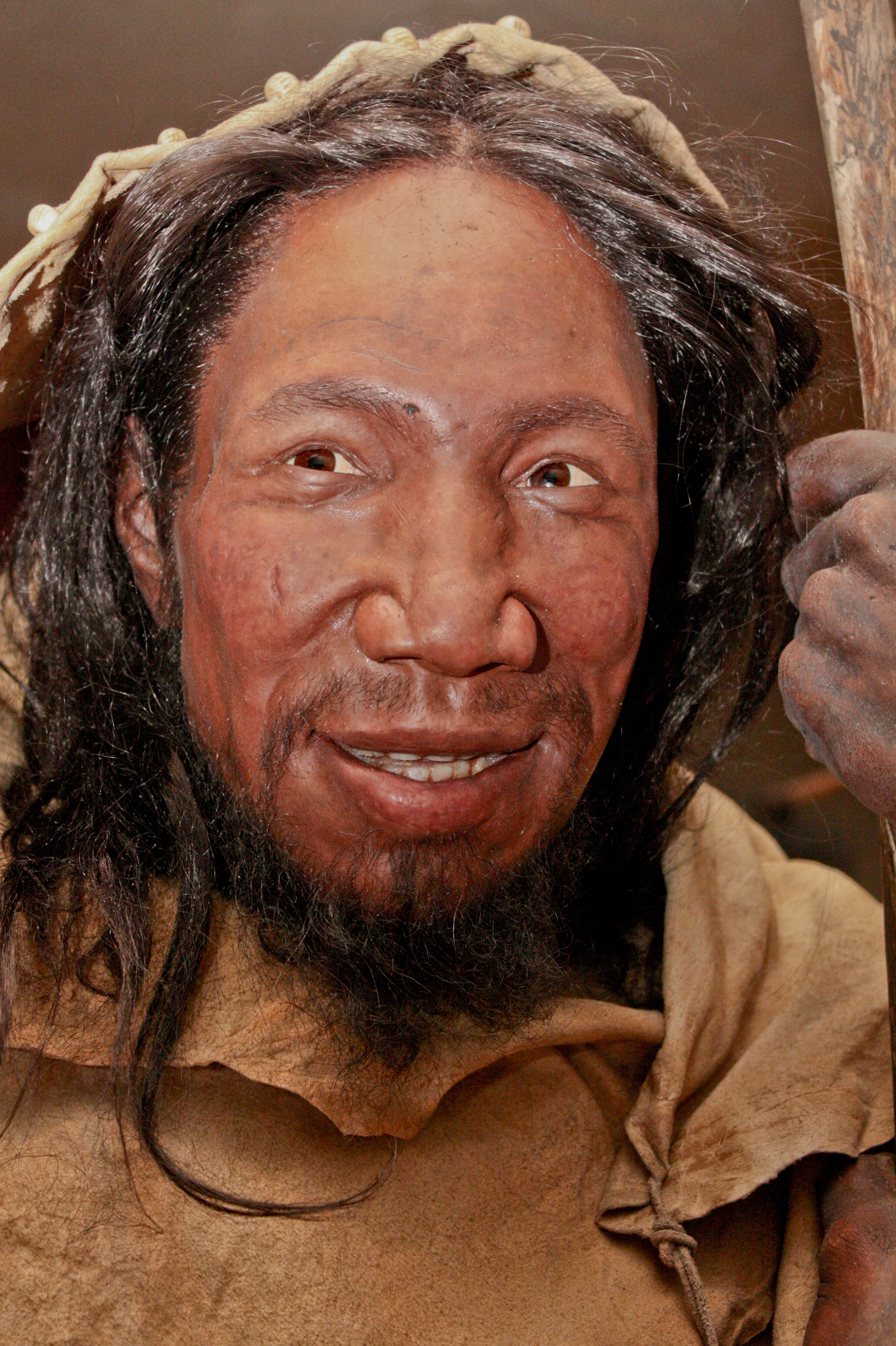
Reconstruction of a Cro-Magnon Homo sapiens, based on bones found in the cave Peştera cu Oase, Romania, from 37–42kya, at the museum

The museum also houses the NESPOS Society e.V. (Pleistocene People and Places) which provides an interactive database on all anthropological and archaeological data connected with the Neanderthals in the form of "3D–images of CT-Scans and surface scans, as well as high-resolution photographs of human fossils and artifacts". Software, developed digitally by NESPOS on the basis of all fossil collections, is distributed freely, which includes scans of 600 fossils and artifacts from Belgium, Croatia, France and Germany.

=== Special exhibitions ===
The museum houses special exhibitions. From March 2012 to October 2012, visitors were able to explore an exhibition about monkeys. This was developed by the museum at a cost of €120,000, and had a total of 43,000 visitors. In 2013, it could be seen at the Naturhistorisches Museum in Braunschweig. The subsequent special exhibition at the Neanderthal Museum featured wolves and was created by the Görlitz branch of the Naturmuseum Senckenberg; it was opened on 18 November 2012 and was on display until 17 March 2013. Over the course of this exhibition, dog owners were allowed to take their dogs into the museum on four days; this initiative was based on the precedent by the Phaeno Science Center in Wolfsburg that has an annual dog day.

The special exhibition "Ice Age Journey Greenland" was open until 3 November 2024. It focused on the archaeology, history and culture of Greenland.

== Services ==
=== Research ===
The Neanderthal Museum Foundation, apart from its present exhibits, also supports research with an interdisciplinary academic approach with particular emphasis on research of the early history of humanity. International excavations and research projects are also actively pursued programmes. The museum encourages lay people to facilitate investigations on local prehistory. The museum has the world's largest database on glacial archaeology, under the title "NESPOS". Its activities include holding international conferences and symposiums on a regular basis, which "generate interdisciplinary contacts and spark new ideas and perspectives" and the proceedings of which are published in scientific series published by the museum. The museum's work in archaeological and palaeo-anthropological research is displayed through the audiovisuals screened with the aid of several types of multimedia equipment. The museum has an exhaustive collection of scientific publications and movies related to the prehistory of Europe and western Asia, as well as many scientific journals and monographs, at its media centre.

=== Education programmes ===
The museum specifically operates a programme to disseminate knowledge to teachers (including pre-school teachers) through its Permanent Exhibition and Stone Age Workshop. Children are also encouraged to learn from the exhibits which are not part of the school curriculum. In this regard the display areas in the garden such as the Discovery Site, the “Human Traces” art trail and the Ice Age Game Reserve are very topical for children in particular. The Neanderthal Museum also conducts a workshop on the Stone Age, which is educative not only to children but also to the youth and older people. In this workshop, access is provided to prehistoric fossils like bone, leather or sinew, prehistoric tools and techniques used in the daily life of our ancestors.

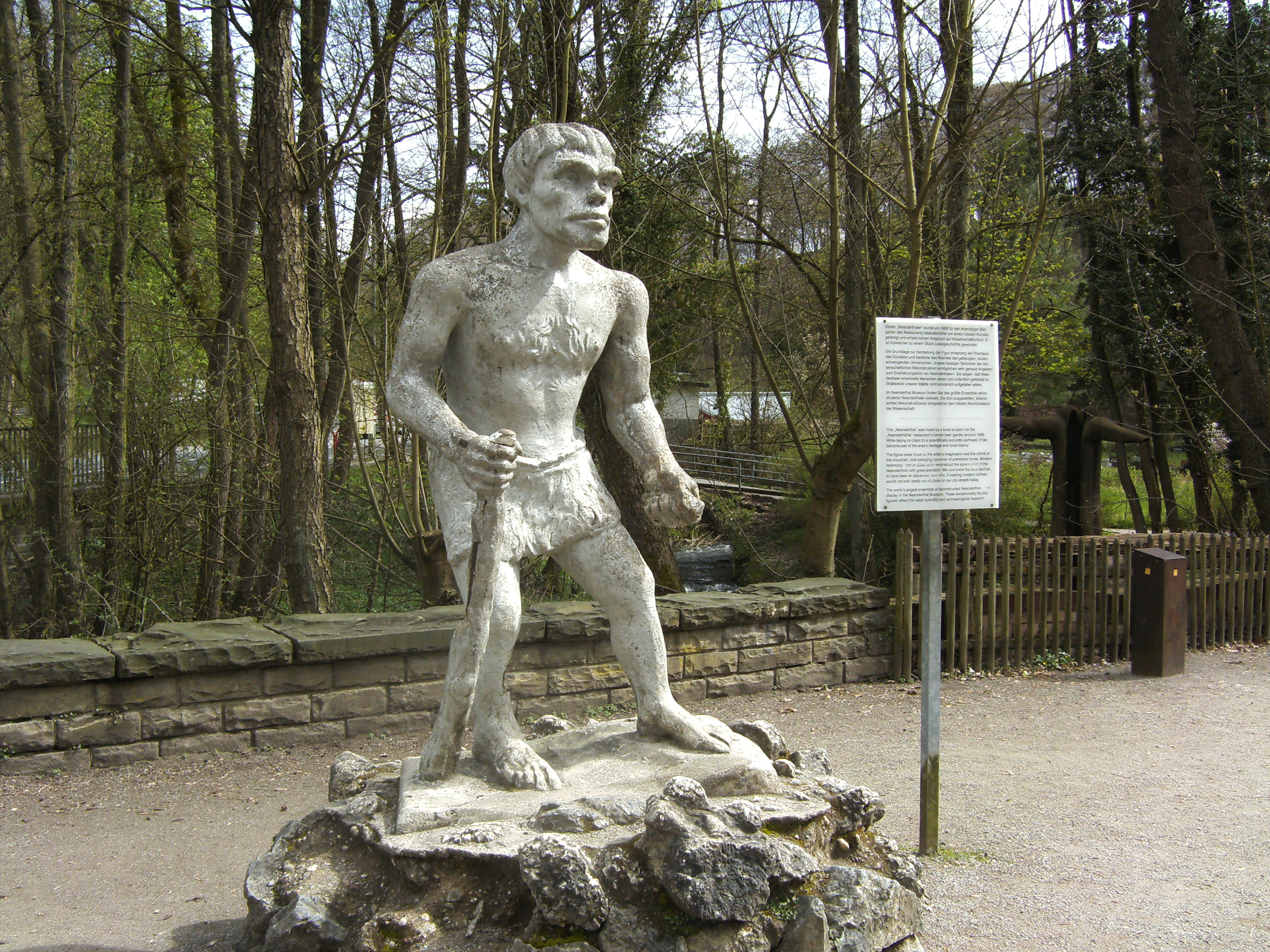
A reconstructed sculpture of a Neanderthal made in 1928 on display in the museum grounds

== Grounds ==
In the garden area, which is developed in the precincts of the museum to represent the Neander Valley, there are many attractions along the labelled paths labelled such as the art trail "Human Traces". Towards the Game reserve, the aurochs and the wild horses can be seen. The original excavated site where fossils of Neanderthal man were found is close to the museum.

== Awards ==
The museum has received many appreciation medals for architecture, exhibits, its website and tourism, between 1997 and 2009:

- Architekturpreis Beton 1997, by the Bundesverband der Deutschen Zementindustrie (Federal Association of the German Cement Industry)
- "Auszeichnung guter Bauten", BDA-Award Düsseldorf 1997, by the Bund Deutscher Architekten (Federation of German Architects)
- European Museum of the Year Award Special Commendation 1998, by the European Museums Forum
- "Architektur Preis Nordrhein-Westfalen 1998", by the Bund Deutscher Architekten (Federation of German Architects)
- “Goldstar-Award” in 1999 for the Website by the International Council of Museums; Rheinland Award 2000 for innovative tourism management in the Rhineland
- "Neuere deutsche Architektur - Eine reflexive Moderne" (current architecture in Germany - a reflexive modern way) by a national and international committee for the special exhibition in 2002
- Special award of the Neanderthal Museum, in 2003, for the best concept of life and presentation of culture by the Foundation "Lebendige Stadt"
- Selected place in the "country of ideas" in 2006, by the initiative "Deutschland - Land der Ideen" (Germany - country of ideas)
- Selected place in the "country of ideas", in 2009, by the initiative "Deutschland - Land der Ideen" (Germany - country of ideas).
