= Mettmann =

- Town
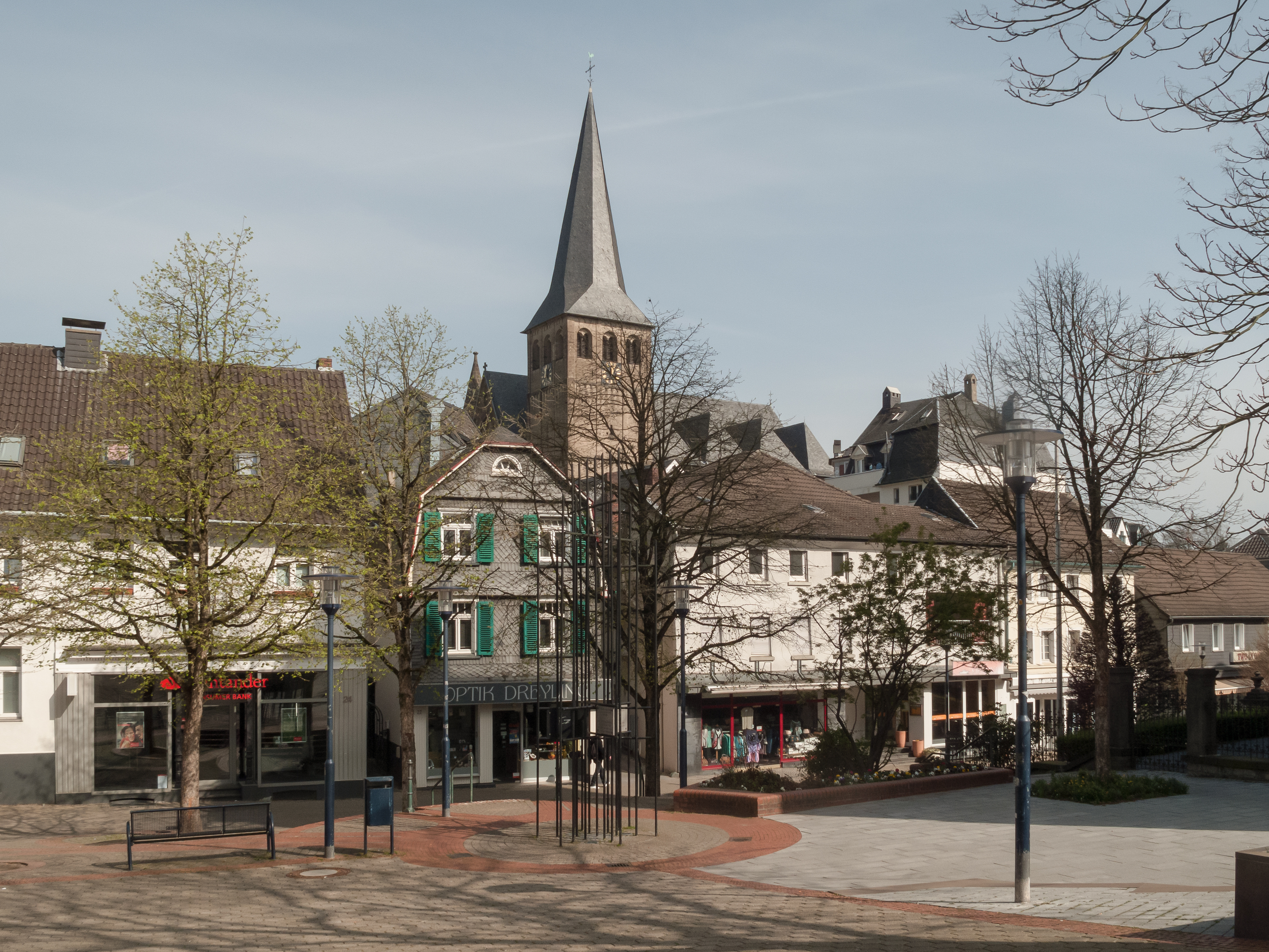

- Flag Coat of arms

- Location of Mettmann within Mettmann district
- Interactive map of Mettmann
- Location within Germany Location within North Rhine-Westphalia
- Coordinates: 51°15′N 6°58′E
- Country: Germany
- State: North Rhine-Westphalia
- Admin. region: Düsseldorf
- District: Mettmann

Government
  - Mayor (2025–30): André Bär

Area
  - Total: 42.56 km^{2} (16.43 sq mi)
- Elevation: 125 m (410 ft)

Population (2025-12-31)
  - Total: 39,595
  - Density: 930.3/km^{2} (2,410/sq mi)
- Time zone: UTC+01:00 (CET)
  - Summer (DST): UTC+02:00 (CEST)
- Postal codes: 40822
- Dialling codes: 02104
- Vehicle registration: ME
- Website: www.mettmann.de

Mettmann (German: [ˈmɛtˌman]) is a town in the northern part of the Bergisches Land, in North Rhine-Westphalia, Germany. It is the administrative centre of the district of Mettmann, Germany's most densely populated rural district. The town lies east of Düsseldorf and west of Wuppertal. A local variety of the Limburgish language called Metmannsch Platt is spoken in town.

== History ==
Located on the ancient trade route "strata coloniensis" the Lotharingian hamlet of Medamana (engl. between the streams, which bears an etymological similarity to the origins of the name for the Northern Italian city of Milan (lat. Mediolanum)) first appeared in the charter of the last Carolingian King, Louis the Child, 904 AD, thus existing "officially" for more than 1100 years.

In 1363 Mettmann was one of eight administrative burghs in the Earldom of Berg and Jülich. Later the burgh became independent at the hand of Counsellor to the Earl of Cleves and was allowed to build a wall and choose a mayor. The ability to toll and tax allowed the burgh to develop in commerce and trade.

In 1806 Mettmann became a part of the Grand Duchy of Berg under the rule of Napoleon's brother-in-law, Joachim Murat. During this time, Mettmann's burgomaster was called "Monsieur le Maire." Mettmann remained French for about 10 years and became a part of Prussia's Province of Jülich-Cleves-Berg following Napoleon's defeat at the Battle of Leipzig in 1813. As the result of the Congress of Vienna (1814–15), in 1822 it was adsorbed into the Prussian Rhine Province.

However, the Prussian rulers did not prove to be very popular, as during the bread-riots of 1848–49 and the ensuing political upheavals, which hit the district of Düsseldorf among the hardest, policing was done from Berlin, excluding local accountability. Thus, the Prussian government regarded the Rhinelands as more of a colony, furnishing the bureaucracy, which was based in Düsseldorf, with civil servants that were drafted in from other regions of Prussia.

Mettmann was liberated from the National Socialist Dictatorship April 16, 1945, by a vanguard of the US Ninth Army and then became a part of the British military administration under which the Northern Rhineland was redemocratised. Since 1946, Mettmann is a part of the Land North Rhine-Westphalia and from 1949 of West Germany. Since 1990 it belongs to the unified Federal Republic of Germany.

== Demographics ==
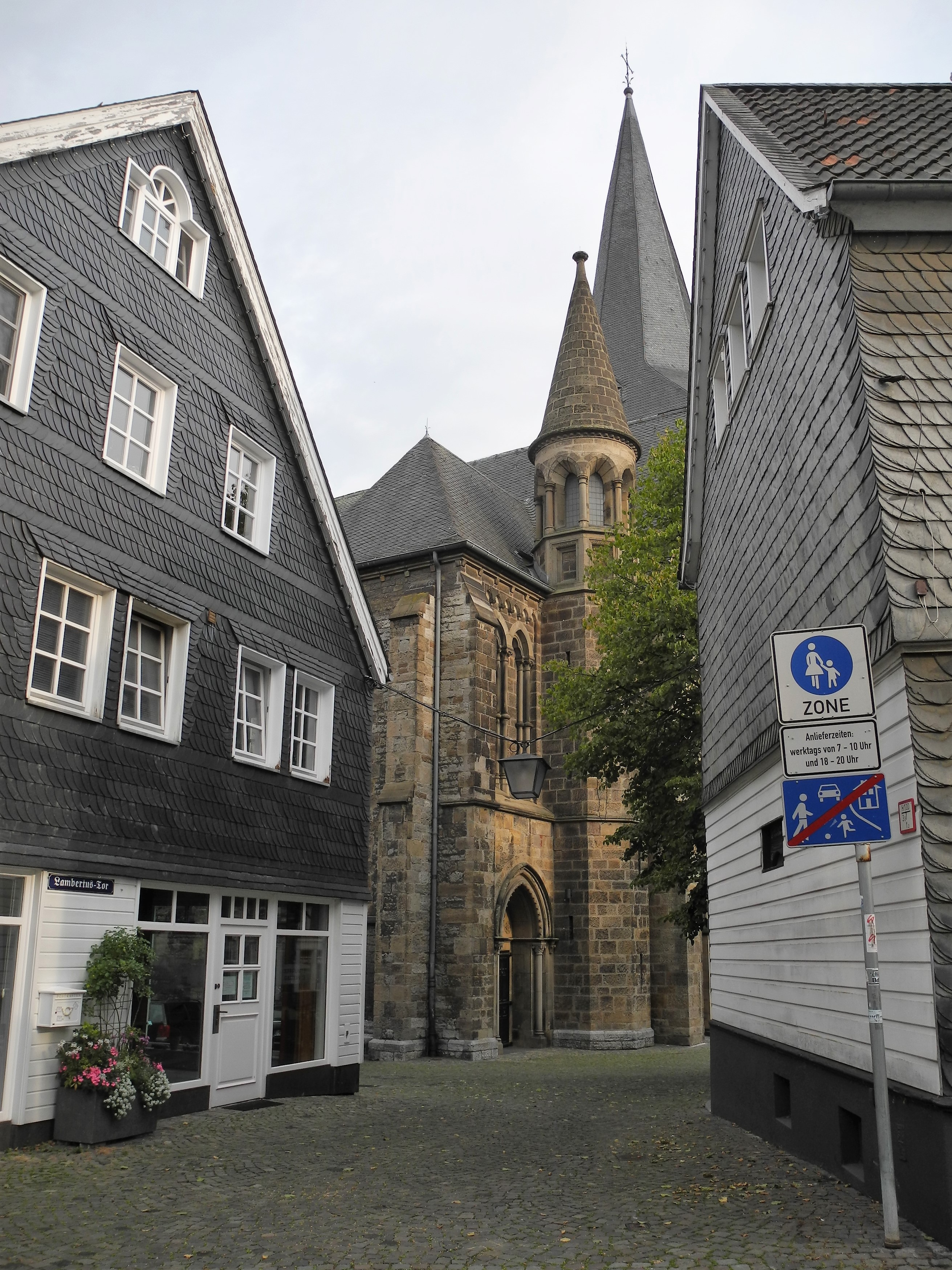
Catholic Church (Sankt Lambertus) and town center

Historical population

Year	Pop.	±% p.a.
1965	31,493	—
1970	36,415	+2.95%
1975	36,828	+0.23%
1980	36,680	−0.08%
1985	35,982	−0.38%
1990	38,998	+1.62%
1995	38,812	−0.10%

Year	Pop.	±% p.a.
2000	38,708	−0.05%
2005	39,670	+0.49%
2010	39,300	−0.19%
2015	38,291	−0.52%
2020	38,749	+0.24%
2025	39,595	+0.43%

Source: Landesdatabank Nordrhein-Westfalen

In the years following Germany's loss of World War II in 1945, Mettmann saw significant population increases driven mostly by the resettlement of citizens like the Thither Pomeraninans previously living in the eastern territories that had been ceded to Poland. Having seen almost no war-time destruction and being situated in a traditionally strong economic region, the town soon prospered, in line with a general period of rapid economic growth that acquired the moniker Wirtschaftswunder (economic miracle).

A shortage of industrial workers led to several recruitment campaigns in Mediterranean countries, starting with Italy in the early 1960s, and followed by Turkey later that decade. These communities soon thrived and established cultural markers such as the Pizza and kebab restaurants that are now ubiquitous throughout western Germany. Later events such as the Lebanese Civil War and the Balkan Wars were also reflected in the town's makeup, which now comprises communities of Turks, Kurds, Kashubians, Old Prussians, Silesians, Poles, Greeks, Croatians, Serbs, Albanians, Bosnians and Lebanese heritage, each distinct but generally well-integrated into the Rhenish-Westphalian majority population and its traditions.

Due to festivals and other events that took place in Mettmann to which many Brazilians were flown in, the town also became the host of a sizeable Brazilian community, this fact was also featured in the German movie Samba in Mettmann by the German/Italian filmmaker duo Hape Kerkeling and Angelo Colagrossi.

== Government and politics ==
Mettmann gave its name to the District of Mettmann. Although the administrative centre of the District of Mettmann changed often over the years, in 1954 the parliament of the Land North Rhine-Westphalia eventually decided to make Mettmann the district's administrative centre. In 1974–75, with the administrative boundary reform, the district lost several councils to the neighbouring cities Düsseldorf, Duisburg, Essen, and Wuppertal. The district name also changed from Düsseldorf-Mettmann to Mettmann during this reform. However, the regional Board of Inland Revenue—the "Finanzamt Düsseldorf-Mettmann"—serves both the municipalities forming the district of Mettmann, as well as the city of Düsseldorf proper.

== Sites of interest ==
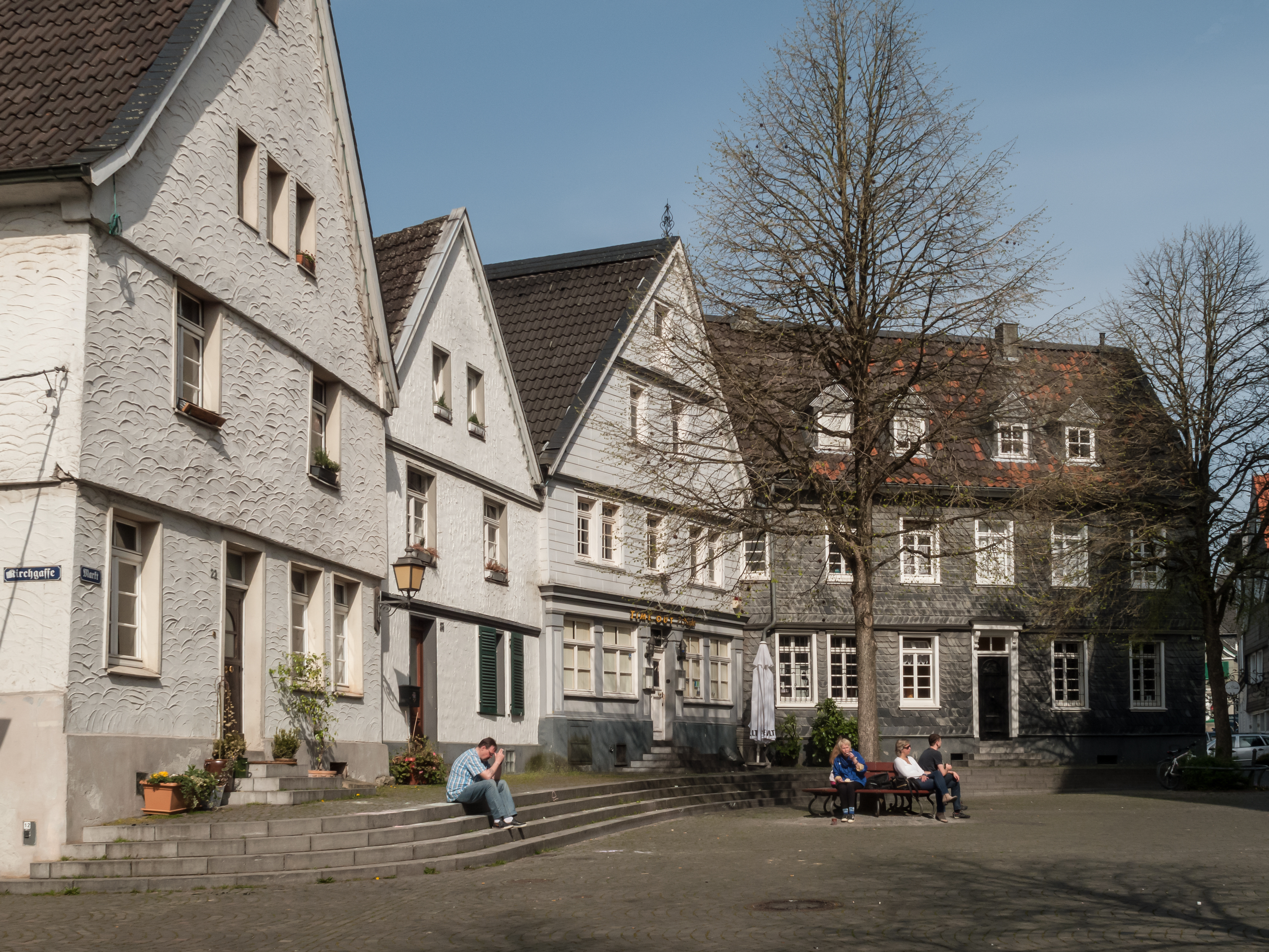
The market

In the nearby Neanderthal, in the summer of 1856, quarry workers discovered the fossilised remains of what became known as the Neanderthal man or Homo neanderthalensis in Feldhof cave.

- Neanderthal Museum in Neanderthal
- Historical downtown with central market, mansions typical black slate lining
- Town Museum
- Goldberger Mill in Mettmann Stadtwald

== Notable people ==
- Konrad Heresbach (1496–1576), reformer, Calvinist, humanist and educator
- Joachim Neander (1650–1680), Church teacher, theologian and hymn writer
- Johannes Flintrop (1904–1943), Roman Catholic critic
- Thomas Huber (born 1955), a Swiss artist, lived and worked here
- Kristina Bach (born 1962), singer and music producer
- Frank Kschischang (born 1962), Electrical Engineering Professor at University of Toronto
- Campino (born 1962), a German-British singer, lived here
- Martin Kaymer (born 1984), golfer

== Twin towns – sister cities ==
Mettmann is twinned with:

- Laval, France (1974)

=== Friendly cities ===
Mettmann also has friendly relations with:

- Żnin, Poland (1997)
- Goražde, Bosnia and Herzegovina (1998)
- Markranstädt, Germany
