= List of Neanderthal fossils =

This is a list of Neanderthal fossils.

== Some important European Neanderthals ==
Remains of more than 300 European Neanderthals have been found. This is a list of the most notable.

Name	Age	Cranial capacity (cm^{3})		Country	Discovered by	Now located at
Ehringsdorf skull	150k–120k	1450	1908–1925	Germany		Archäologischen Landesmuseums Thüringen
Engis 2	Undated	? (child)	1829	Belgium	Philippe-Charles Schmerling	University of Liège
Gibraltar 1	40k	1200	1848	Gibraltar	Edmund Flint	Natural History Museum, London
Gibraltar 2	Undated	? (child)	1926	Gibraltar	Dorothy Garrod	Natural History Museum, London
Krijn	100-40 ka	(Not a full skull)	2001	Netherlands	Luc Anthonis	Rijksmuseum van Oudheden, Leiden
La Chapelle-aux-Saints 1	30k	1600	1908	France	L. Bardon, A. Bouyssonie and J. Bouyssonie	
La Ferrassie 1	70k–50k	1641	1909	Italy	Louis Capitan and Denis Peyrony	Musée de l'Homme
Neanderthal 1	40k	1452	1856	Germany	Kleine Feldhofer Grotte	Rheinisches Landesmuseum Bonn
Saccopastore 1	250k	1200	1929	Italy		
Saccopastore 2	250k	1300	1935	Germany	Alberto Blanc and Henri Breuil	
Altamura Man	170k		1993	Italy		

== Southwest Asian Neanderthals ==
As of 2017, this list of Southwest Asian Neanderthals may be considered essentially complete.

List of Southwest Asian Neanderthals
Present-day country (country of discovery)	Site	Principal Neanderthal finds	MNI	Geological age (ka)	Descriptions	Notes
Turkey	Karain	Four teeth	1	—	Senyürek (1949) Yalçınkaya (1988)	
Lebanon	Ksâr 'Akil	K2: Teeth and partial maxilla	1	—	Ewing (1963)	Ewing lost this specimen while transferring Ksar Akil material from Boston College to Fordham University.
Lebanon	El Masloukh	Upper second molar	(1)	—	?	Neanderthal attribution is stratigraphic, not morphological.
Israel	Kebara	KMH1: 7-9 mo. old partial skel. KMH2: Post-cranial adult ♂ Various fragments KMH3: Milk tooth (m^{1}-r); KMH4: 9 milk teeth, germ of 1 permanent tooth KMH5: Child mandibular symphysis fragment, no teeth KMH6: Right maxillary fragment with M^{1} and M^{2} KMH7: Milk tooth (m_{?}-r); KMH8: Milk tooth (m^{2}-l); KMH9: Foot bone (4th right metatarsal); KMH10: Foot bone (1st toe distal phalanx); KMH11: Right clavicle fragment KMH12: Milk tooth (m^{?}-r); KMH13: Milk tooth germ (m^{1}-l); KMH14: Tooth (M_{2}-l); KMH15: Milk tooth (m^{1}-r); KMH16: Milk tooth (left i_{1}); KMH17: Clavicle fragment (KMH18: Mandibular fragment with tooth [M^{2}-r]) (KMH19: Fragmentary tooth crown [M_{?}-r]) (KMH20: Parietal bone fragment) (KMH21: Germ of tooth [M^{1}-l]) (KMH22: Milk tooth [upper c-l]) (KMH23: Milk tooth [i_{2}-r]); KMH24: Tooth (M^{3}-l) (KMH25: 3 milk teeth germs [upper c-l, m^{1}, m^{2}]) (KMH26: Tooth germ [i^{2}-r]); KMH27: Tooth (I^{2}); KMH28: Tooth (I_{2}) (KMH29: Milk tooth [i_{2}-l]); KMH30: Milk tooth (m^{1}) (KMH31: Tooth [lower c])	21 + (10)	64-59	KMH1: Smith et al. (1977) KMH2: Arensburg et al. (1985); KMH5-17, 24-31 : Tillier et al. (2003)	Neanderthal attribution uncertain in KMH18-23, 25, 29, and 31
West Bank (Mandatory Palestine)	Shuqba	S-D1: Tooth and cranial frags.	1	—	Keith (1931)	
Israel (Mandatory Palestine)	Tabun	T C1: Nearly complete adult ♀ T C2: Toothed mandible missing I_{1} (♂) Various fragments T E1: Right femur shaft (♂?); T E2: Tooth (M_{1} or M_{2}, ♀?); T C3: Right femur shaft (♀); T C4: Distal right radius frag. (♀); T C5: Right hamate bone T C6: Right pisiform bone T C7: Distal thumb phalanx T B1: 10-11 year-old maxilla (♂?) with I^{2}-r, M^{2}-r; T BC2: Four teeth (I^{2}-l, M^{1}-l, P^{3}-r, M^{1}-r); T B3: One tooth (I_{2}-r); T B4: Four teeth (I^{1}-l, I^{2}-l, M_{1}-l, M_{3}-r); T B5: Two teeth (M^{2}-l, M^{2}-r); T BC6: Two teeth (I^{1}-l, M_{2}-l)	15	≈170-90	McCown (1936); McCown and Keith (1939)	T C1: Neanderthal attribution is not universally accepted. As of 1975, the whereabouts of T BC2, B3, and BC6 are unknown.
Israel	Ein Qashish	(EQH-2: Third molar) EQH-3: Adult lower limbs	1 + (1)	70-60	Been et al. (2017)	Discovered in 2013, these were the first diagnostically Neanderthal remains in Southwest Asia not found in a cave. EQH-2: 70% posterior probability that Neanderthal attribution is correct.
Israel	Shovakh	(Tooth, M_{(3)}-l (Note: M_{?}-r according to S. Binford (1966).))	(1)	—	S. Binford (1966) Trinkaus (1987)	"[A]lthough within archaic and modern human ranges of variation, this complex occlusal morphology may suggest that it is more likely to have derived from a Neandertal than an early modern human". (Trinkaus 1987)
Israel	Amud	A1: Adult full skeleton ♂ A2: Maxillary fragment A7: 10-mo.-old partial skel.	3 (Note: Valladas, Mercier, and Froget (1999) write that "[o]f the remains of 18 individuals recovered at the Amud Cave, 15 were derived from unambiguous Middle Palaeolithic contexts, all of them located in the northern area of the excavation (Hovers et al., 1995). The stratigraphic distribution of these remains encompasses the layers B_{1} and B_{2}, with only a single specimen derived from layer B_{4} (Sakura, 1970). Three individuals bear diagnostic characteristics which define them as Neanderthals. Amud I, the skeleton of an adult male was found at the top of layer B1, while the partial skeleton of the baby Amud 7 (Rak, Kimbet & Hovers, 1994) was recovered from the top of layer B_{2}, just under the contact with the base of layer B_{1}. Amud II, represented by a fragment of the right maxilla, was excavated from layer B_{2}.")	61-53	A1: Suzuki et al. (1970) A7: Rak et al. (1994)	
Syria	Dederiyeh	D1: 19-30-month-old full skel. D2: 21-30-month-old full skel.	17	—	D1: Akazawa et al. (1993) D2: Akazawa et al. (1999)	
Iraq	Shanidar	S1: Adult partial skel. ♂ S2: Adult crushed skel. ♂ S3: Post-cranial adult ♂ S4: Adult partial skel. (♂); S5: Adult partial skel. (♂); S6: Adult partial skel. (♀); S7: 6-9-mo.-old crushed skel. S8: Adult skeletal fragments (♀); S9: 6-12-month-old vertebrae S10: 17-25-month-old skel.	10	S2, S4: > 100 Others: 60	S1: Stewart (1959) S2: Stewart (1961); S3: Solecki (1960); S4: Stewart (1963); S5: Trinkaus (1977); Pomeroy et al. (2017) S6: Same as S4; S7: Senyürek (1957); S8: Same as S4; S9: ? S10: Cowgill et al. (2007)	Shanidar 2 and 4 are sometimes not treated as Neanderthals. All but Shanidar 3 and 10 (and fragments of 5 excavated in 2015-2016) may have been destroyed in the 2003 invasion of Iraq.
Iran	Bawa Yawan	Lower left deciduous canine	1	~43,600-~41,500 years ago	Heydari-Guran et al (2021)	
Iran	Wezmeh	maxillary right premolar tooth	1	70-40	Zanolli et al. (2019)	
Iran	Bisitun	Adult radius shaft	1	—	Trinkaus and Biglari (2006)	
Total			71 + (13)			

== Central and North Asian Neanderthals ==
Central Asian Neanderthals were found in Uzbekistan and North Asian Neanderthals in Asian Russia.

Country	Site	Principal Neanderthal finds	MNI	Geological age (ka)	Initial descriptions	Notes
Uzbekistan	Teshik-Tash	8-11-yr-old skeleton	1	—	Okladnikov (1949)	
Uzbekistan	Obi-Rakhmat	Subadult skull frag. and teeth	1	74	Glantz et al. (2008)	
Asian Russia	Chagyrskaya	Partial mandible	1	—	(Announced in Viola 2012)	
Asian Russia	Okladnikov	Sub-adult humerus and femur	1		(Announced in Krause et al. 2007)	mtDNA sampled
Asian Russia	Denisova	Altai 1: Toe phalanx♀ D11: Bone fragment	2	—	Mednikova (2011) Brown, et al. (2016)	Altai 1: Full genome sequenced D11: mtDNA sampled
Total			6			

== See also ==
- List of Neanderthal sites
- List of Southwest Asian Neanderthals
- Neanderthal Museum
- List of fossil sites
- List of human fossils
