= Solecki =

Solecki, feminine: Solecka, is a Polish-language surname. It is a toponymic surname for someone associated with a place named Solec. The latter place name is derived from the word sól meaning "salt". Notable people with the surname include:

- Elżbieta Penderecka nee Solecka (born 1947), Polish cultural activist
- John Solecki, American United Nations official
- Ralph Solecki (1917–2019), American archaeologist
- Rose Solecki (born 1925), American archaeologist

== See also ==
- Soletsky (disambiguation)
- Soliński, a surname with a similar etymology
