= Neanderthals in Southwest Asia =

Neanderthals who lived in Turkey, the Levant, Iraq, and Iran

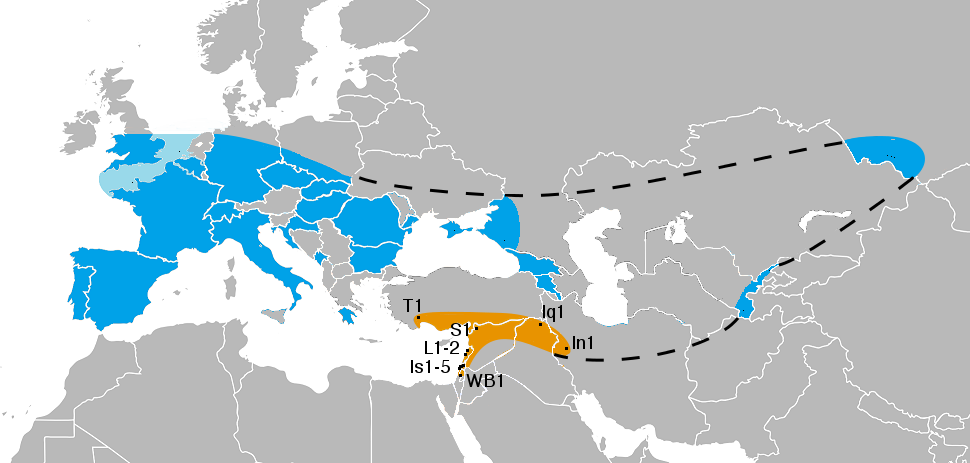
The known range of Neanderthals in Southwest Asia (orange) and elsewhere. Sites that have yielded skeletal remains, tagged by country – Turkey (T1): Karain. Lebanon (L1–2): Ksâr 'Akil and El Masloukh. Israel (Is1–5): Kebara, Tabun, Ein Qashish, Shovakh, and Amud. Palestine (WB1): Shuqba. Syria (S1): Dederiyeh. Iraq (Iq1): Shanidar. Iran (In1): Bisitun. Iran (In1):Wezmeh.

Southwest Asian Neanderthals were Neanderthals who lived in Turkey, Lebanon, Syria, Israel, Palestine, Iraq, and Iran – the southernmost expanse of the known Neanderthal range. Although their arrival in Asia is not well-dated, early Neanderthals occupied the region apparently until about 100,000 years ago. At this time, Homo sapiens migration seem to have replaced them in one of the first anatomically-modern expansions out of Africa. In their turn, starting around 80,000 years ago, Neanderthals seem to have returned and replaced Homo sapiens in Southwest Asia. They inhabited the region until about 55,000 years ago.

In Southwest Asia Neanderthals have left well-preserved skeletal remains in present-day Palestine, Syria, and Iraq. Remains in Turkey, Lebanon, and Iran are fragmentary. No Neanderthal skeletal remains have ever been found to the south of Jerusalem, and although there are Middle Palaeolithic Levallois points in Jordan and in the Arabian peninsula, it is unclear whether these were made by Neanderthals or by anatomically modern humans. Neanderthals living further to the east, such as those found in present-day Uzbekistan and Asian Russia are known as Central and North Asian Neanderthals.

As of 2013, although many more Neanderthal remains have been discovered in Southwest Asia than in North Asia, where genetic studies have succeeded, no attempt at extracting DNA from Southwest Asian Neanderthals has ever been successful.

== Early hominins (to 100 ka) ==
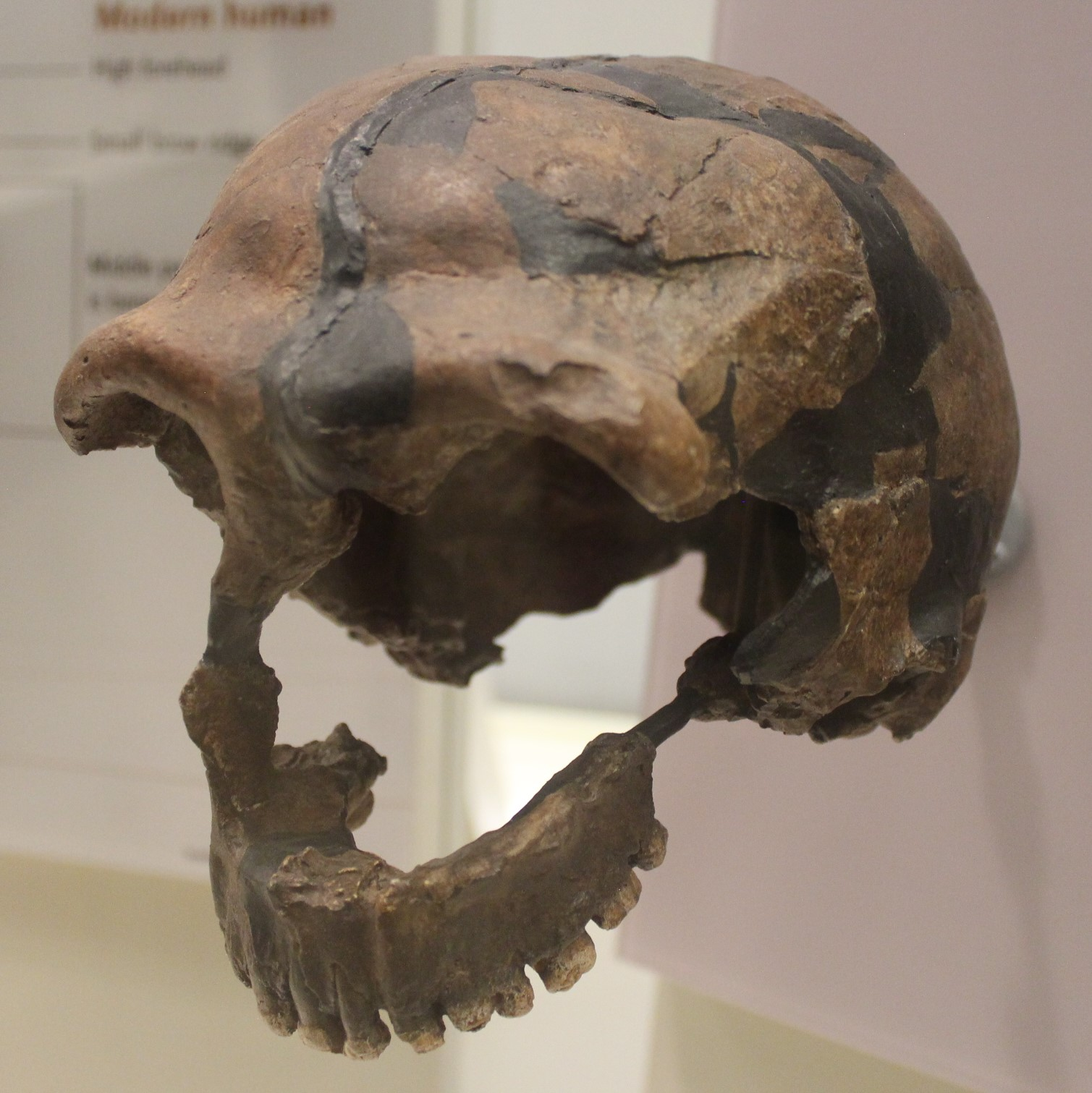
One of the southernmost Neanderthals: Homo neanderthalensis fossil from Tabun Cave, Israel. 120.000-50.000 BC. Israel Museum.

As the Levant is the landbridge to Eurasia, Dmanisi remains in Georgia from 1.81 Ma suggest that hominins passed through the Levant some time before this (unless they crossed the Bab el-Mandeb strait into Arabia). The oldest known hominin specimen from the Levant, and from all the Middle East, is the Zuttiyeh skull, found by Francis Turville-Petre near the Sea of Galilee in 1927. It has not been dated, but lithic industries suggest it dates from 350–250 ka (Bar-Yosef 1992). Though it has some modern characteristics, it has been classified as a specimen of Homo heidelbergensis.

Other known hominin fossils in Southwest Asia older than 100 ka include Shanidar 2 and 4, as well as Tabun C1. All three have at one point been classified as Neanderthals, although the latter two are now usually called pre-Neanderthals. In part because none are well-dated these attributions have all been challenged.

== Early AMHs in the Levant (100 to 80 ka) ==
It is believed that anatomically modern humans first entered the Levant by 130 – 100 ka (Grün 2005) from Africa during the Last Interglacial, a hot, parched, period in Africa (Scholz et al. 2007).

=== Environment ===
Goat δ^{13}C values from c. 92 ka collected at Qafzeh Cave show that goats were eating, depending on the season, between 20 and 50% of C_{4} plants. These plants are better adapted to dry and hot climates than the much more common C_{3} plants. Although it was already established that North Africa was arid in the early Last Glacial, Scholz et al. (2007)'s conclusions would extend this to the Levant, making the region in this period more arid than previously thought. Frumkin et al. (2011) arrived at a similar conclusion of a hot and arid Levant by examining changes through time of lake levels and in the formation of cave formations.

== Return of Neanderthals to the Levant (80 to 55 ka) ==
Potential causes for the initial extinction of modern humans from the Levant and subsequent replacement by Neanderthals around 80 ka include a short-term extreme environmental change in the Levant and environmental changes in the regions neighbouring the Levant. The only long-term environmental change that has been found in the Levant at this period is an increase in rainfall (Hallin et al. 2012), and some moderate cooling of the region (Bar-Yosef 1992, Harrison and Bates 1991), which would not predict a hominin extinction (Hallin et al. 2012). Hence, a short-lived intense environmental change (such as a volcanic winter of 6 to 1000 years caused by the Toba supereruption, Rampino and Self 1992) might have caused modern human extinction, especially if the modern human Levantine population was low (Shea 2008). In this case, Neanderthals could have moved in during or after the modern human evacuation of the region.

=== Environment ===
Contrarily to modern humans who arrived in the Levant in a period particularly warm in both Eurasia and Africa, Neanderthals are thought to have entered the Levant in a period of increasing Eurasian coldness and aridity known as the Last Glacial Period (Tchernov 1989). In the Levant, however, the conditions would have been wetter than those of today and of the preceding interglacial. This is what Hallin et al. (2012) concluded in their study of the δ^{13}C and δ^{18}O (Note: δ^{13}C and δ^{18}O are so-called isotopic signatures. They respectively measure the prevalence of the heavier carbon-13 (^{13}C) and oxygen-18 (^{18}O) isotopes over the more common carbon-12 and oxygen-16. C_{4}-pathway plants have relatively more ^{13}C (higher δ^{13}C) than C_{3}-pathway plants. Because C_{4} plants are better adapted to hot and dry climates than C_{3} plants, high δ^{13}C values are associated with hot and dry environments. To the contrary, a greater prevalence of ^{18}O (higher δ^{18}O) in (land) animal bones reflects a colder environment: Because ^{16}O is lighter than ^{18}O, water molecules of the form H_{2}^{16}O evaporate slightly more readily than those of the H_{2}^{18}O form. This difference in evaporation is greater the colder the environment gets, so that rain and snow in colder regions have a lower δ^{18}O value. Animals incorporate the δ^{13}C and δ^{18}O information of their environment and it is possible to extract it from their bones and teeth.) values of goat and gazelle enamel from Amud cave in Neanderthals layers dated to 70–53 ka (Glacial Period), after comparing them to values from Qafzeh cave in a modern human layer dated to 92 ka. They found that at Amud, neither the goats nor the gazelle consumed arid-adapted C_{4} plants, indicating that the environment was not as dry as today. They found the magnitude and pattern of δ^{18}O values in gazelle and goat teeth enamel to indicate that, unlike today, rain fell throughout the year at Amud in the Neanderthal period. Indeed, the variation in δ^{18}O values in the oldest layers of the teeth, formed when the animal is only a few months old, suggested that goats and gazelles were born throughout the year, which today happens only in the Levant in wetter-than-normal conditions.

Belmaker et al. (2011) compared the prevalence in caves of microfaunal bones brought back by Barn and Eagle owls, which are known to accumulate large quantities of rodent skeletons. Since owls are opportunistic hunters and will eat any small mammal, the bone assemblage they leave behind are thought to be accurate indicators of the environment, given that rodents, like beetles, are susceptible to small changes in temperature and humidity. The researchers did find changes in microfaunal bone assemblages, but all were expected by taphonomic bias. They therefore concluded that there were no significant changes in the environment of the Levant between 70 and 55 ka.

== Return of AMHs to the Levant (after 55 ka) ==
Unless modern humans started expanding into Eurasia through Arabia (where stone tools but very few human bones have been found), the Levant was most likely the first place Neanderthals lost ground to expanding modern humans.

It is unclear why Neanderthals abandoned the Levant or lost it to modern humans. Shea (2008) has argued that Neanderthals were climatically forced out of the region (as modern humans probably were about 75,000 years ago). This is contested. Belmaker et al. (2011) have found that the proportions of microfaunal bones in the Levant between 70 and 55 kya seem stable, despite the fact that small fauna are sensitive to slight changes in temperature or humidity. There would be hence little reason to believe in a slow deterioration of the Neanderthal habitat driving them out by 45 kya. It is possible that climate change drove Neanderthals to extinction quickly some time after 55,000 BP, but Hallin et al. (2012) found strong consistency through time in the δ^{13}C and δ^{18}O values in the teeth of both goats and gazelles, suggesting that the climate was stable in the Levant at this crucial period when Middle Palaeolithic technologies of Neanderthals and early modern humans were replaced by Upper Palaeolithic technology of later modern humans.

Although the environment at this period in the Levant seems to have been stable, Shea (2008) suggested that a rapidly changing environment at the border between the Levant and the Sinai could have stimulated the development of the first Upper Palaeolithic technologies. In this scenario, modern humans would only have been able to displace Neanderthals once they had developed this technology. The advanced tools found in Europe in the millennia thereafter would have developed there and then.

== Resource gathering strategy ==
It is believed that Neanderthals and modern humans in the Levant had different resource gathering behaviours. Lieberman and Shea (1994) analysed their lithic hunting technologies and found their differences to suggest Neanderthals hunted more frequently than modern humans. They argue that Neanderthals would have used their intensive hunting strategy to cope with a biodepleted environment, much like the Inuit of the 20th century used to depend largely on hunting. Henry et al. (2017) found that in the Levant the site exploitation territory of Neanderthals was narrow, as they limited themselves to rugged woodlands, while modern humans of the Upper Palaeolithic would have been generalists with large exploitation territories in both the rugged woodlands and levelled steppe landscapes.

Although it does seem as if the environment favoured the initial success and eventual demise of Neanderthals, it is still unclear whether differences in their resource gathering strategies reflect differences in the environment, in anatomy, or in intelligence.

== List of Southwest Asian Neanderthals ==
The remains of more than 70 Southwest Asian Neanderthals have been found. Sites are sorted west to east, first by country (westernmost site) then within countries. Important remains are in bold.

List of Southwest Asian Neanderthals
Present-day country (country of discovery)	Site	Principal Neanderthal finds	MNI	Geological age (ka)	Descriptions	Notes
Turkey	Karain	Four teeth	1	—	Senyürek (1949) Yalçınkaya (1988)	
Lebanon	Ksâr 'Akil	K2: Teeth and partial maxilla	1	—	Ewing (1963)	Ewing lost this specimen while transferring Ksar Akil material from Boston College to Fordham University.
Lebanon	El Masloukh	Upper second molar	(1)	—	?	Neanderthal attribution is stratigraphic, not morphological.
Israel	Kebara	KMH1: 7-9 mo. old partial skel. KMH2: Post-cranial adult ♂ Various fragments KMH3: Milk tooth (m^{1}-r); KMH4: 9 milk teeth, germ of 1 permanent tooth KMH5: Child mandibular symphysis fragment, no teeth KMH6: Right maxillary fragment with M^{1} and M^{2} KMH7: Milk tooth (m_{?}-r); KMH8: Milk tooth (m^{2}-l); KMH9: Foot bone (4th right metatarsal); KMH10: Foot bone (1st toe distal phalanx); KMH11: Right clavicle fragment KMH12: Milk tooth (m^{?}-r); KMH13: Milk tooth germ (m^{1}-l); KMH14: Tooth (M_{2}-l); KMH15: Milk tooth (m^{1}-r); KMH16: Milk tooth (left i_{1}); KMH17: Clavicle fragment (KMH18: Mandibular fragment with tooth [M^{2}-r]) (KMH19: Fragmentary tooth crown [M_{?}-r]) (KMH20: Parietal bone fragment) (KMH21: Germ of tooth [M^{1}-l]) (KMH22: Milk tooth [upper c-l]) (KMH23: Milk tooth [i_{2}-r]); KMH24: Tooth (M^{3}-l) (KMH25: 3 milk teeth germs [upper c-l, m^{1}, m^{2}]) (KMH26: Tooth germ [i^{2}-r]); KMH27: Tooth (I^{2}); KMH28: Tooth (I_{2}) (KMH29: Milk tooth [i_{2}-l]); KMH30: Milk tooth (m^{1}) (KMH31: Tooth [lower c])	21 + (10)	64-59	KMH1: Smith et al. (1977) KMH2: Arensburg et al. (1985); KMH5-17, 24-31 : Tillier et al. (2003)	Neanderthal attribution uncertain in KMH18-23, 25, 29, and 31
West Bank (Mandatory Palestine)	Shuqba	S-D1: Tooth and cranial frags.	1	—	Keith (1931)	
Israel (Mandatory Palestine)	Tabun	T C1: Nearly complete adult ♀ T C2: Toothed mandible missing I_{1} (♂) Various fragments T E1: Right femur shaft (♂?); T E2: Tooth (M_{1} or M_{2}, ♀?); T C3: Right femur shaft (♀); T C4: Distal right radius frag. (♀); T C5: Right hamate bone T C6: Right pisiform bone T C7: Distal thumb phalanx T B1: 10-11 year-old maxilla (♂?) with I^{2}-r, M^{2}-r; T BC2: Four teeth (I^{2}-l, M^{1}-l, P^{3}-r, M^{1}-r); T B3: One tooth (I_{2}-r); T B4: Four teeth (I^{1}-l, I^{2}-l, M_{1}-l, M_{3}-r); T B5: Two teeth (M^{2}-l, M^{2}-r); T BC6: Two teeth (I^{1}-l, M_{2}-l)	15	≈170-90	McCown (1936); McCown and Keith (1939)	T C1: Neanderthal attribution is not universally accepted. As of 1975, the whereabouts of T BC2, B3, and BC6 are unknown.
Israel	Ein Qashish	(EQH-2: Third molar) EQH-3: Adult lower limbs	1 + (1)	70-60	Been et al. (2017)	Discovered in 2013, these were the first diagnostically Neanderthal remains in Southwest Asia not found in a cave. EQH-2: 70% posterior probability that Neanderthal attribution is correct.
Israel	Shovakh	(Tooth, M_{(3)}-l (Note: M_{?}-r according to S. Binford (1966).))	(1)	—	S. Binford (1966) Trinkaus (1987)	"[A]lthough within archaic and modern human ranges of variation, this complex occlusal morphology may suggest that it is more likely to have derived from a Neandertal than an early modern human". (Trinkaus 1987)
Israel	Amud	A1: Adult full skeleton ♂ A2: Maxillary fragment A7: 10-mo.-old partial skel.	3 (Note: Valladas, Mercier, and Froget (1999) write that "[o]f the remains of 18 individuals recovered at the Amud Cave, 15 were derived from unambiguous Middle Palaeolithic contexts, all of them located in the northern area of the excavation (Hovers et al., 1995). The stratigraphic distribution of these remains encompasses the layers B_{1} and B_{2}, with only a single specimen derived from layer B_{4} (Sakura, 1970). Three individuals bear diagnostic characteristics which define them as Neanderthals. Amud I, the skeleton of an adult male was found at the top of layer B1, while the partial skeleton of the baby Amud 7 (Rak, Kimbet & Hovers, 1994) was recovered from the top of layer B_{2}, just under the contact with the base of layer B_{1}. Amud II, represented by a fragment of the right maxilla, was excavated from layer B_{2}.")	61-53	A1: Suzuki et al. (1970) A7: Rak et al. (1994)	
Syria	Dederiyeh	D1: 19-30-month-old full skel. D2: 21-30-month-old full skel.	17	—	D1: Akazawa et al. (1993) D2: Akazawa et al. (1999)	
Iraq	Shanidar	S1: Adult partial skel. ♂ S2: Adult crushed skel. ♂ S3: Post-cranial adult ♂ S4: Adult partial skel. (♂); S5: Adult partial skel. (♂); S6: Adult partial skel. (♀); S7: 6-9-mo.-old crushed skel. S8: Adult skeletal fragments (♀); S9: 6-12-month-old vertebrae S10: 17-25-month-old skel.	10	S2, S4: > 100 Others: 60	S1: Stewart (1959) S2: Stewart (1961); S3: Solecki (1960); S4: Stewart (1963); S5: Trinkaus (1977); Pomeroy et al. (2017) S6: Same as S4; S7: Senyürek (1957); S8: Same as S4; S9: ? S10: Cowgill et al. (2007)	Shanidar 2 and 4 are sometimes not treated as Neanderthals. All but Shanidar 3 and 10 (and fragments of 5 excavated in 2015-2016) may have been destroyed in the 2003 invasion of Iraq.
Iran	Bawa Yawan	Lower left deciduous canine	1	~43,600-~41,500 years ago	Heydari-Guran et al (2021)	
Iran	Wezmeh	maxillary right premolar tooth	1	70-40	Zanolli et al. (2019)	
Iran	Bisitun	Adult radius shaft	1	—	Trinkaus and Biglari (2006)	
Total			71 + (13)			

== See also ==
- Dawn of Humanity (2015 PBS documentary)
- Gibraltar Neanderthals
- Origins of Us (2011 BBC documentary)
- Prehistoric Autopsy (2012 BBC documentary)
- The Incredible Human Journey (2009 BBC documentary)
