= Neanderthal (disambiguation) =

Neanderthal, or Neandertal, was a species of the genus Homo that inhabited Europe and parts of western Asia.

Neanderthal or Neandertal may also refer to:

- Neandertal (valley), North Rhine-Westphalia, Germany, location of the first found Neanderthal specimen
- Neanderthal 1, the skull found in Neandertal in 1856
- Neanderthal (novel), a 1996 novel by John Darnton
- Neanderthal (album), a 2008 album of Danish band Spleen United
- "Neanderthal Man", a 1970 song by English band Hotlegs.

== See also ==
- Neanderthal genetics
- Neanderthal extinction
- Neanderthal anatomy
- Neanderthal Museum, in Mettmann, Germany
- Neanderthal genome project
- Neanderthals in Gibraltar
- List of Neanderthal fossils
- List of Neanderthal sites
- Neanderthals in Southwest Asia
- Krapina Neanderthal site
- Neanderthal man (disambiguation)
- Neanderthals in popular culture
- Joachim Neander (1650–1680), German Reformed (Calvinist) Church teacher
