= Vigo Park, Texas =

Unincorporated community in Texas, US

Coordinates: 34°39′09″N 101°29′46″W

Vigo Park is an unincorporated community in Swisher County, Texas, United States. It is located along FM 146 in northeastern Swisher County, approximately ten miles south of Wayside and 53 miles southeast of Amarillo. Vigo Park had about a population of 10 as of August 2018. According to the Handbook of Texas, the community had an estimated population of 31 in 2000.

== Geology ==
An interstadial (a warmer period during a glaciation) dated 15,000 BC – penultimate interstadial of the Würm glaciation – was identified in Vigo Park and bears its name. Its European equivalent was determined by paleopalynology pioneer Arlette Leroi-Gourhan who named it "interstade de Lascaux" after the famous Lascaux cave where she first found its traces – she later also found it in the Lagopede shelter, one of the caves in Arcy-sur-Cure; and corroborating studies determined it wherever the corresponding archaeological layers allowed for analysis.
