= Rose Solecki =

American archaeologist (1925–2019)

- Born: Rose Muriel Lilien; November 18, 1925 (age 100); New York City, U.S.
- Occupation: Archaeologist
- Spouse: Ralph Solecki
- Relatives: John Solecki, William Solecki (sons)

Rose L. Solecki (born November 18, 1925) is an American archaeologist, who worked with her husband Ralph Solecki on excavations in Iraq, Iran, Turkey, Syria, Lebanon, and Sudan.

== Early life ==
Rose Muriel Lilien was born in New York City, the daughter of Israel Lilien and Anna Muchel Lilien. Her father was born in Poland. Her brothers Harry and Sidney were baseball card collectors before World War II. She earned a bachelor's degree in anthropology from Hunter College in 1945, and her master's and doctoral degrees from Columbia University. While she was a graduate student at Columbia, she participated in archaeological excavations in Arizona under the supervision of Emil W. Haury, and in Peru under the supervision of William Duncan Strong. She wrote A Study of Central Andean Ceramic Figurines (1981) based on her doctoral research.

== Career ==
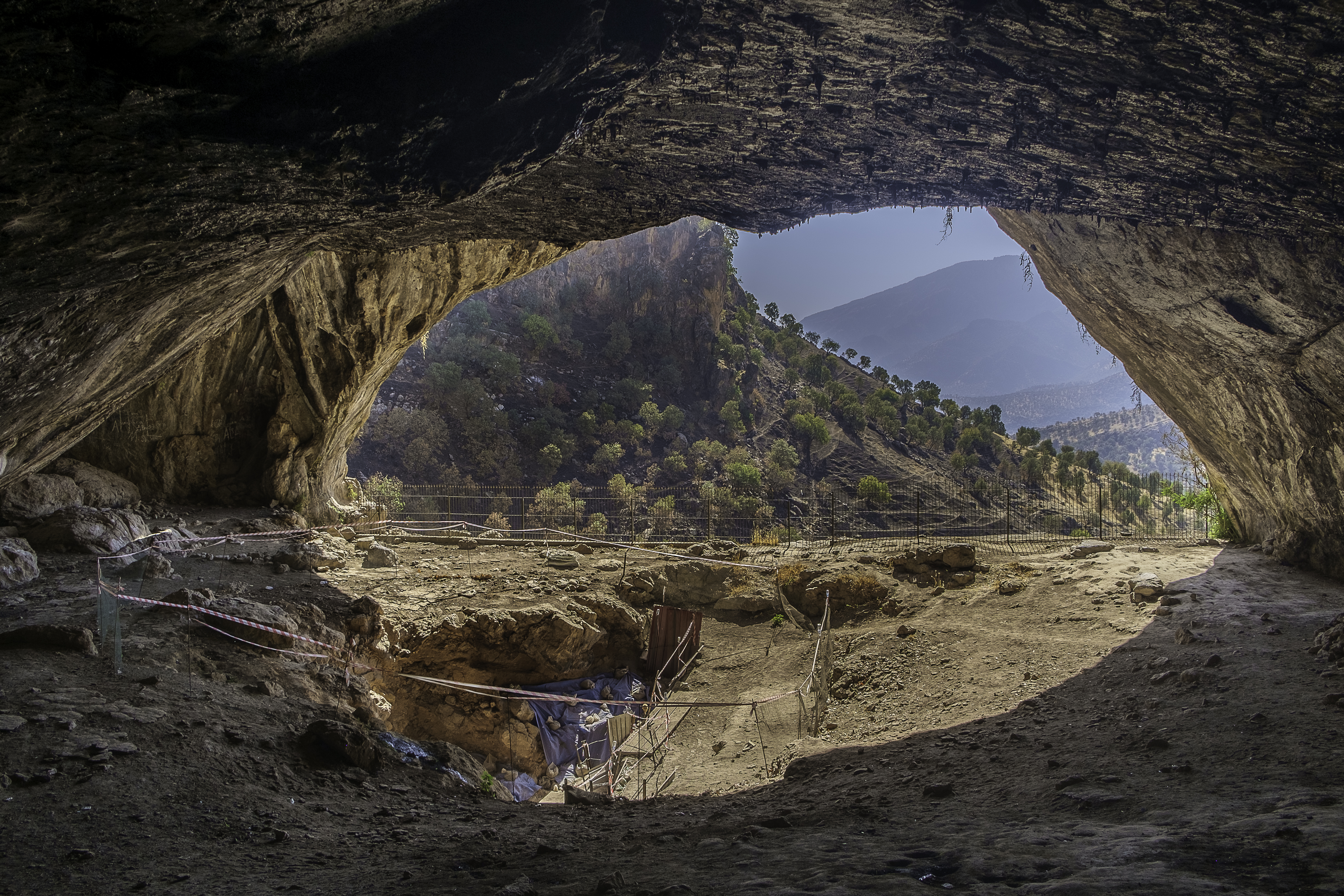
Shanidar Cave in Iraq, site of the Soleckis' archaeological work in the 1950s and 1960s.

Rose Solecki joined her husband's excavation of the Shanidar cave sites in Iraq between 1956 and 1960. The sites contained rich evidence of Neanderthal life, including several complete skeletons. They also had archaeological projects in Lebanon, Iran, Turkey, Syria, and Sudan. Until Ralph Solecki's retirement in 1990, she was a research associate affiliated with Columbia University; from 1990 to 2000, Rose Solecki was Adjunct Professor of Anthropology at Texas A&M University.

The Soleckis co-authored many scholarly articles, and The Proto-Neolithic Cemetery in Shanidar Cave (2004, with Anagnostis P. Agelarakis), based on their years of work in Iraq. Rose Solecki also wrote Tepe Seavan, a Dalma Period Site in the Margavar Valley, Azerbaijan, Iran (1973) and An Early Village Site at Zawi Chemi Shanidar (1981).

== Personal life ==
Rose married Ralph Solecki in 1955. They had two sons, John Solecki (a United Nations official) and William Solecki (a geography professor). Ralph Solecki died in 2019, aged 101 years. The Soleckis' papers, and a 2018 oral history with both of them, are archived in the National Anthropological Archives, Smithsonian Institution. Columbia University gives an annual Ralph and Rose Solecki Award, for an archaeology student chosen by the faculty.
