= Bradost (mountain) =

Mountain in Iraq

- Chia-y Bradost (Nawakhin)
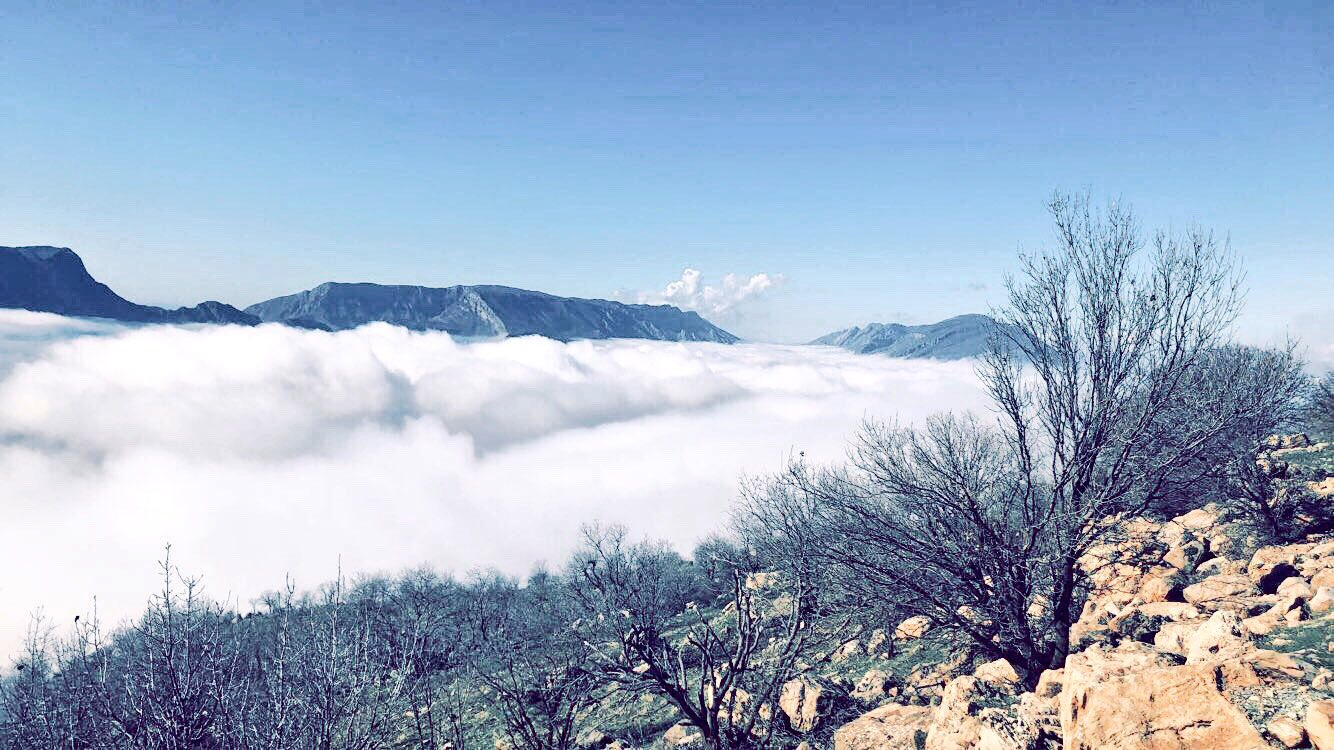
- Bradost mountain range

Highest point
- Elevation: 5,000 ft (1,500 m)+

Dimensions
- Length: 25 mi (40 km)

Naming
- Native name: تاڤگەی بێخاڵ

Geography
- Location: Erbil Governorate, Kurdistan Region, Iraq
- Country: Kurdistan
- Range coordinates: 36°48′N 44°19′E

Bradost or Chia-y Bradost (Nawakhin), a mountain range over 5,000 feet above sea level and about 25 miles long, stretches northwest from the Rawanduz river opposite the town of Rawanduz in Erbil Governorate, Kurdistan Region, Iraq, to Rubari kuchuk, a tributary of the Great Zab.

The Shanidar Cave, a Neanderthal archaeological site, lies about 15 km N-W from its peak.
