= Amud 1 =

Hominin fossil

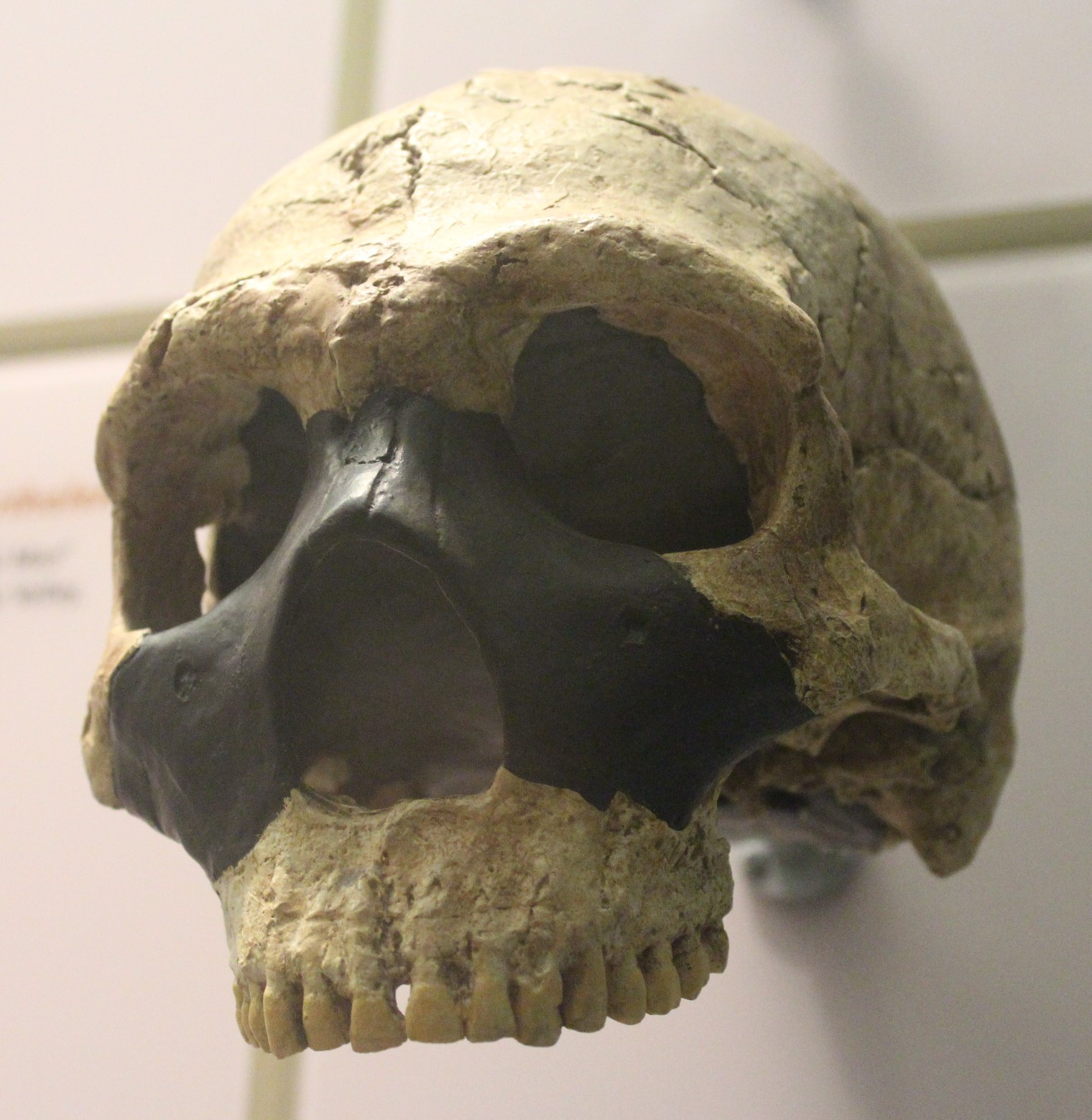
- Amud 1 cranium cast without the mandible
- Catalog no.: Amud 1
- Species: Homo neanderthalensis
- Age: 55,000 years
- Place discovered: Amud Cave, Levantine
- Date discovered: July 1961
- Discovered by: Hisashi Suzuki and others

Amud 1 is a nearly complete but poorly preserved adult Southwest Asian Neanderthal skeleton thought to be about 55,000 years old. It was discovered at Amud Cave in Israel by Hisashi Suzuki in July 1961, who described it as male. With an estimated height of 1.78 m (5 ft 10 in), it is considerably taller than any other known Neanderthal, and its skull has by far the largest cranial capacity (1736-1740 cm^{3}) of any human skull in the fossil record. According to Ralph Holloway, this makes it one of the most famous Neanderthal specimens.

The skull was found very high in the stratigraphy and was not only mixed with Upper Palaeolithic artefacts, but also with pottery from levels further above. Because of this the first two published dates of Amud 1 and other remains were not taken seriously when they suggested an extremely recent time (by Neanderthal standards) of 28,000 and 20,000 years. It has since been redated by ESR to about 55,000 years.

Like other Neanderthal specimens in the Levant (such as Tabun C1 and the Shanidar specimens), Amud 1's skull is long, broad, and intermediate in cranial vault height as compared with European Neanderthals and modern humans. With a supposedly large nose and a big face, moderate midfacial prognathism, a small brow ridge and small teeth, Amud 1 exhibits an unusual mosaic of features compared to European Neanderthals. Contrary of majority of other Neanderthals, especially European Neanderthals, its brow ridges are slender and it has a somewhat developed chin. Amud 1 is considerably taller than any other known Neanderthal, with long arms and legs and a considerably more gracile development.

Suzuki initially interpreted these features as intermediate between Levantine Neanderthals (the Tabun and Shanidar specimens) and Levantine anatomically modern humans (Skhul and Qafzeh). In 1995, Hovers et al. argued that its cranial and mandibular particularities made it fully Neanderthal, although this is rejected by Belfer-Cohen (1998). Amud 1 shares many traits with early Homo sapiens and modern sapiens, and is sometimes mis-classified as Homo sapiens based through multivariate analysis, unlike all other Neanderthals.

The Amud 1 facial skeleton was incomplete and fragmentary; its assumed form has been reconstructed, and hence measurements of the specimen (particularly with regard to the midface) are speculatory. In 2015 a virtual reconstruction by Japanese scientists indicated that the Amud 1 facial skeleton was smaller than previously estimated, and that the cranial vault was shorter and more brachycephalic during the individual's lifetime; having been deformed in situ by geological pressure.

The skeleton is currently held at Tel Aviv University, Israel.

== See also ==
- Southwest Asian Neanderthals
- List of Neanderthal fossils
