= Soliński =

Soliński, spelling variant: Solinsky, feminine: Solińska, is a Polish-language surname. It is a toponymic surname for someone associated with a place named Solina or Soliny. The latter place names are derived from the word sól meaning "salt". Notable people with the surname include:

- Chris Solinsky (born 1984), retired American distance runner and an American college cross country coach
- Jacek Soliński (born 1957), Polish painter, photographer, publicist and publisher
