= Theodore E. White =

American paleontologist and zooarchaeologist

Theodore Elmer White (1905–1977), also known as "Ted" or "Doc", was an American paleontologist and zooarchaeologist. White pioneered the use of animal remains as indicators of human behavior in archaeological settings. He also helped develop the Minimum Number of Individuals (MNI) system, which helps archaeologists determine the minimum number of individuals represented within a skeletal assemblage.

== Life and career ==
White was born in Garnett, Kansas, on December 8, 1905. He spent his childhood in Kansas, eventually attending the University of Kansas, where he earned a Bachelor of Arts degree in 1928 and a Master's degree in 1929 both in zoology. There, he studied herpetology and mammalogy before moving on to osteology and paleontology. He later attended the University of Michigan, earning his PhD in zoology in 1935. Although, he was never classically trained in zooarchaeology, he likely acquired knowledge in the field through his later work.

In 1932, White began working at the Harvard Museum of Comparative Anatomy, where he remained until 1947. During WWII, he served in the US Army as a technical sergeant from 1942 to 1945. After the war, he worked for the Smithsonian Institution's River Basin Surveys. Most of his career, however, was spent in the National Park Service, working at Dinosaur National Monument, where he was hired in 1953 as the park's first paleontologist.

White died on September 7, 1977, and is buried in Welda, Kansas.

== Selected publications ==
- Appraisal of the Archeological and Paleontological Resources of the Niobrara River Basin, Nebraska (1947)
- Collecting Osteological Material or How to Get a Block Plastered
- Observations On the Butchering Technique of Some Aboriginal Peoples: I (1952)
- Studying Osteological Material
- Dinosaur National Monument, Colorado-Utah. The Dinosaur Quarry by John M. Good, Theodore E. White, & Gilbert F. Stucker (2015)
