= Amud Cave =

Archaeological site in Israel

- מערה עמוד (Hebrew)
- Location within Northeast Israel Location within Israel Location within Near East
- 32°52′20″N 35°30′6″E
- Cultures: Mousterian
- Associated with: Neanderthals
- Location: In the Nahal Amud gorge
- Region: Upper Galilee, Israel

Site notes
- Excavation dates: 1961, 1964, 1990-present
- Public access: No

Amud Cave (Hebrew: מערה עמוד) is located in the Upper Galilee, in the Nahal Amud gorge. It is situated about 30 m (98 ft) above Nahal Amud, right next to and above the famous pillar (amud, in Hebrew) for which Nahal Amud is named. The cave was excavated by a Japanese expedition in 1961 and, again, in 1964. Excavations were renewed in 1990 by a joint Israeli-American team that included archaeologists, anatomists and anthropologists. Two major phases of occupation have been identified on the site: the later one beginning at around 3000 BC, characterized by numerous pottery sherds, stone tools and garbage pits (that often disturb lower layers) but no permanent structures, and an earlier one from the Middle Paleolithic. The most important find from this site is Amud 1, discovered in 1961, in the latest Paleolithic layers, that were later dated, using thermoluminescence, to 50-60,000 years BP. It has been classified as Neanderthal, which makes it the youngest Neanderthal ever to have been discovered in the Levant.
