= Neanderthal man (disambiguation) =

Neanderthal man is an extinct human of the genus Homo.

Neanderthal man may also refer to:

- The Neanderthal Man (1953), science-fiction film made in the United States
- "Neanderthal Man" (song) (1970), by English band Hotlegs
- Neanderthal Man: In Search of Lost Genomes (2014), memoir by Neanderthal researcher Svante Pääbo

== See also ==
- Neanderthal (disambiguation)
