= Arlette Leroi-Gourhan =

French archaeologist (1913–2005)

Arlette Leroi-Gourhan (French: [ləʁwa ɡuʁɑ̃]; born Arlette Royer, 9 January 1913, Paris – 25 April 2005, Vermenton) was a French archaeologist who initiated the use of palynology as part of archaeological studies. She also contributed to archaeological excavations.

She was President of Société Préhistorique Française, following her work at the Centre national de la recherche scientifique.

Her two most famous works are the discovery of the "flower burial" in Shanidar 4 tomb, and the analysis of Ramses II's mummy.

== Early life and education ==
Leroi-Gourhan was born Arlette Royer on 9 January 1913 in Paris, to a family of wealthy manufacturers. As a child she partook in sports and arts, as well as travelling throughout Europe and Northern Africa. She studied at École du Louvre, and later École des hautes études en sciences sociales (EHESS). At EHESS, she met André Leroi-Gourhan. Royer and Leroi-Gourhan married in 1936, and travelled to Japan the following year when André took up a two-year position funded by the Government of Japan.

== Career ==
Leroi-Gourhan focused her research on paleobotany, a non-existent field of study at the time. She wrote some 180 papers on the subject and associated topics between 1956 and 2002, some 35 of which were co-written with her husband or/and other scientists. She started a laboratory at Musée de l'Homme, which focused on the analysis of pollen. André Leroi-Gourhan lead the prehistory department at the Centre national de la recherche scientifique (CNRS), so he encouraged Arlette not to seek a position at the centre in order to avoid the appearance of nepotism. Subsequently, she served as a "director without position" for CNRS. In 1971 Leroi-Gourhan served as President of the Société Préhistorique Française (Prehistorical Society of France). During their marriage, Arlette and André Leroi-Gourhan only published one paper together, however Arlette published a paper based on her husband's earlier research in Japan following his death in 1986.
