= Nahal Amud =

River in Upper Galilee region of Israel

Amud
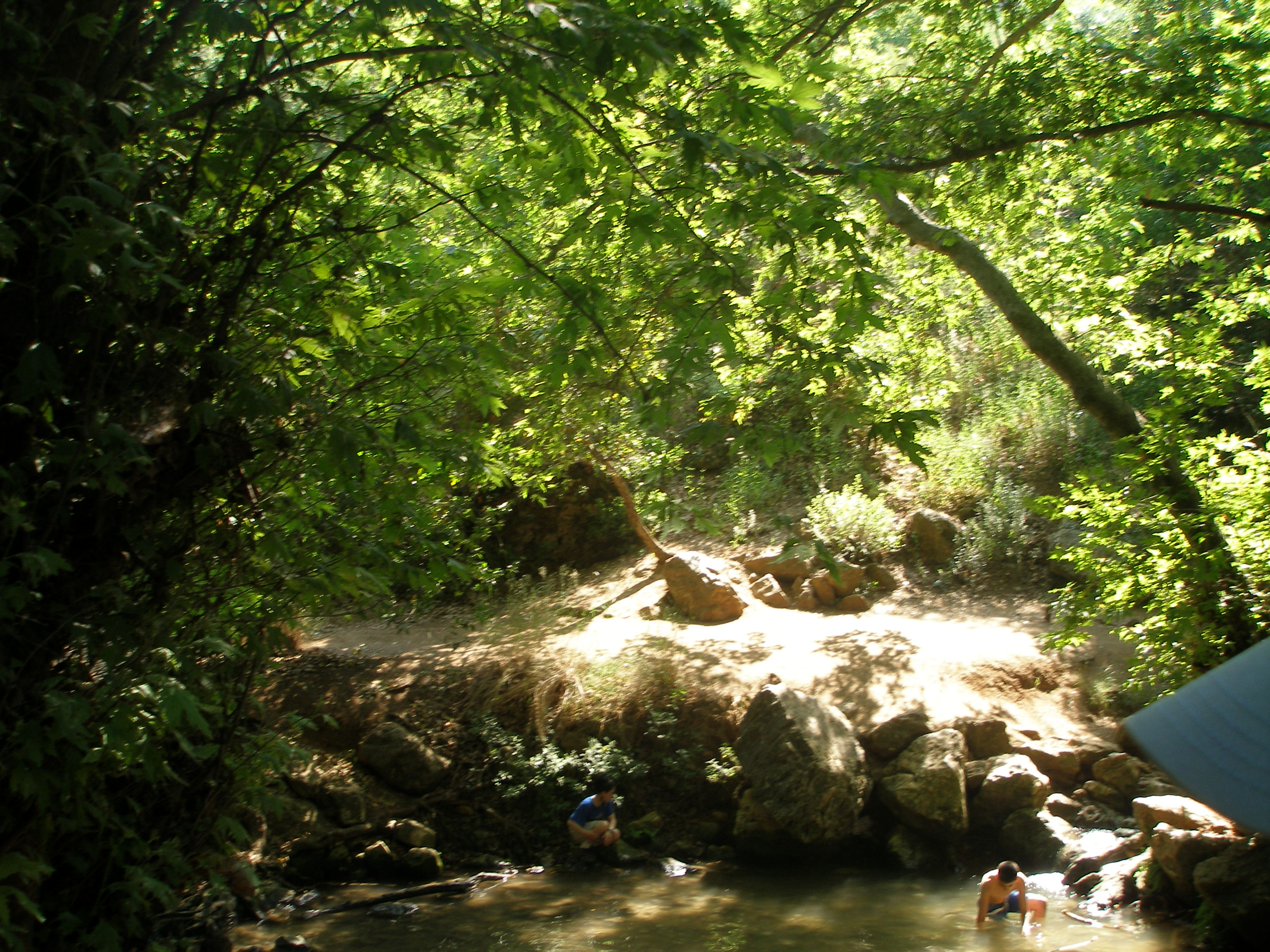
- Nahal Amud

- Location within Israel
- Native name: נחל עמוד (Hebrew); نهر عامود (Arabic)

Physical characteristics
- Source
  - location: Near Kadita, Israel
  - coordinates: 33°0′46.57″N 35°28′2.87″E
  - elevation: 816 m (2,677 ft)
- Mouth: Sea of Galilee
  - location: Ginosar, Israel
  - coordinates: 32°51′11.98″N 35°31′56.9″E
  - elevation: −209 m (−686 ft)
- Length: 24.9 km (15.5 mi)

Nahal Amud (Hebrew: נַחַל עַמּוּד), also known as the Wadi al-Amud, is a stream in the Upper Galilee region of Israel that flows into the Sea of Galilee.

== Geography and Trails ==
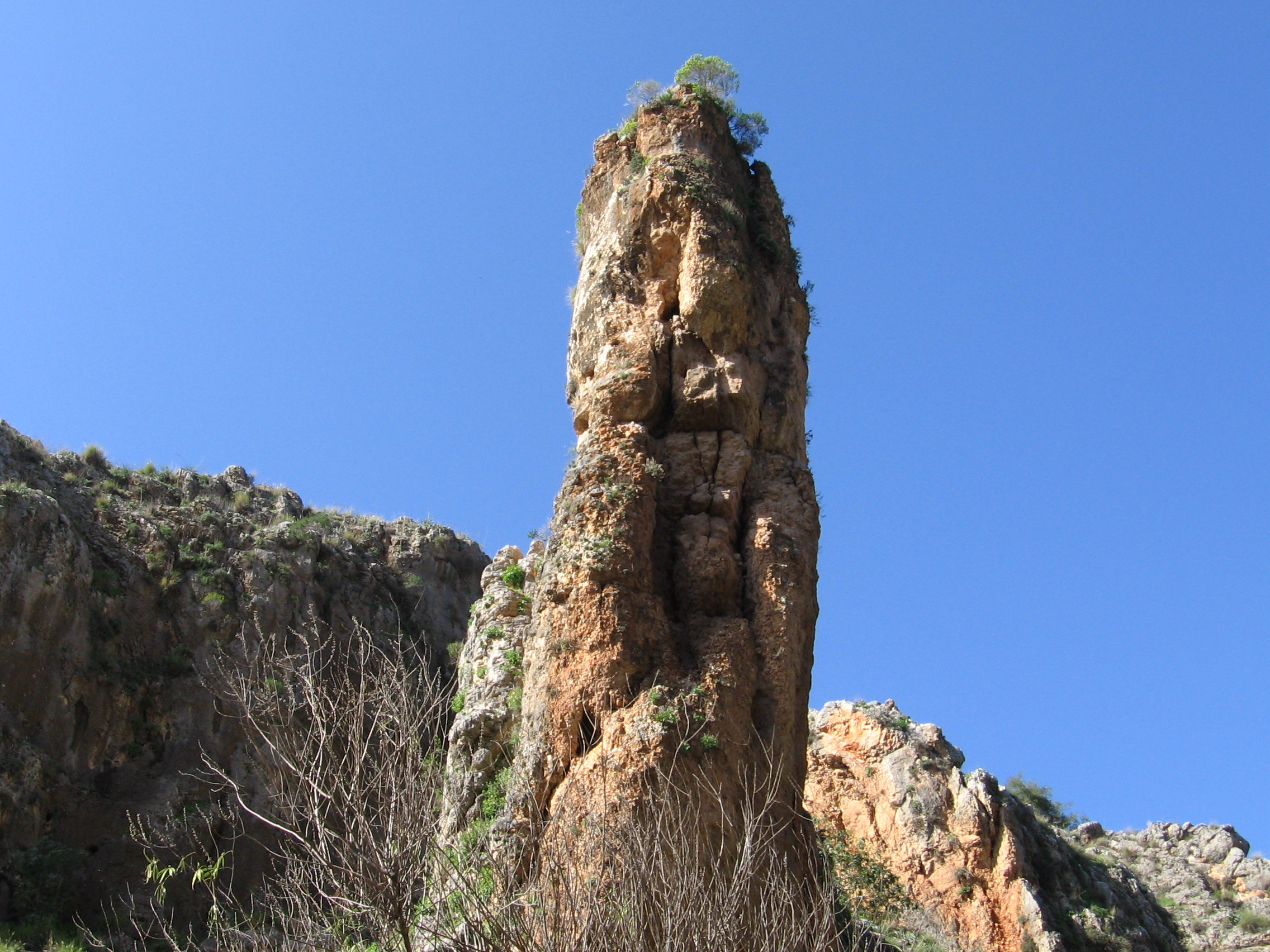
The namesake pillar of Nahal Amud

The source of the stream, Ramat Dalton ('Dalton Heights'; see Moshav Dalton), is located 800 meters above sea level. Its drainage basin includes the peaks of Mount Canaan (955 meters) and Mount Meron (1,204 meters) and flows south through the Upper and Lower Galilee to the northwest part of the Sea of Galilee - an elevation of less than 200 meters below sea level.

The stream is divided into two main parts: Upper Nahal Amud and Lower Nahal Amud. The upper section has water flowing all year round from natural springs, creating scenic pools and small waterfalls. Conversely, the lower section closer to the Sea of Galilee is seasonal and dries up during the summer and autumn months.

The reserve is a popular destination for hiking, and a section of the Israel National Trail passes through it. A well-known 5-kilometer circular trail traverses the upper part of the nature reserve, starting near Route 866. There are also longer and more difficult hiking paths that connect the stream with Mount Mitzpe Hayamim, a high viewpoint where hikers can see both the Sea of Galilee and the Mediterranean Sea at the same time.

== Flora and Fauna ==
The perennial water flow in the upper stream supports dense vegetation, creating a lush, shaded Mediterranean woodland. The ground in the valley is covered with oak leaves and green moss, and the area features large walnut trees, plane trees, and vines shading the water. In the winter and spring, the hills around the stream bloom with many colorful wildflowers, such as red anemones.

The high cliffs of Nahal Amud are an important nesting and resting area for birds of prey, including vultures and eagles. The caves in the canyon also provide shelter to rare and protected species of bats. The aquatic ecosystem supports diverse local wildlife, including dragonflies, frogs, and tadpoles.

== History and Archaeology ==
The stream is named after a pillar that rises high above ground and is located near a channel of the stream near Kibbutz Hukok. The gorge that forms the channel at this point holds many caves once inhabited by Homo heidelbergensis and later by Neanderthals, such as the Zuttiyeh Cave and the Amud Cave. They were the object of the first paleoanthropological excavations in Mandatory Palestine in 1925–1926. The caves contained hominin remains as well as Mousterian and Acheulean artifacts.

== Modern History and Industry ==
Besides prehistoric caves, Nahal Amud has many remains of historic agriculture and industry from later time periods. Along the river, the Israel Nature and Parks Authority restored historic fruit orchards and ancient water channels (aqueducts) that were used to move water. The robust currents were used in the past to turn stone flour mills for grinding wheat. In the 16th century, when the nearby city of Safed was a famous center for clothing and textile making, a special water-powered wool mill (called a "Mivtasha") was built here to process wool using heavy wooden hammers moved by the river.

During the British Mandate, a concrete pumping station was built at the Ein Yakim spring to supply drinking water to Safed. To secure this facility, the British built the Ein Tina police station, a concrete building near the entrance that still has bullet holes in it from the Arab Revolt of 1936–1939. Pumping water from the spring for commercial use stopped in 1995 to protect nature, allowing the water to flow freely into the stream again. The big canyon (gorge) is also crossed by the National Water Carrier of Israel using a large steel inverted siphon that carries water from one side of the 150-meter-deep valley to the other.

== Nature Reserve ==
Most of Nahal Amud (8923 dunams) was declared a nature reserve in 1972.

== Tributaries ==
The tributaries of the stream:

- Meron Stream
- Akbara Stream
- Shamai Stream
- Livnim Stream
- Hukok Stream
- Nahal Hozim

The drainage basin of the stream is bordered by the Korazim Stream and the Zalmon Stream.

== Gallery ==
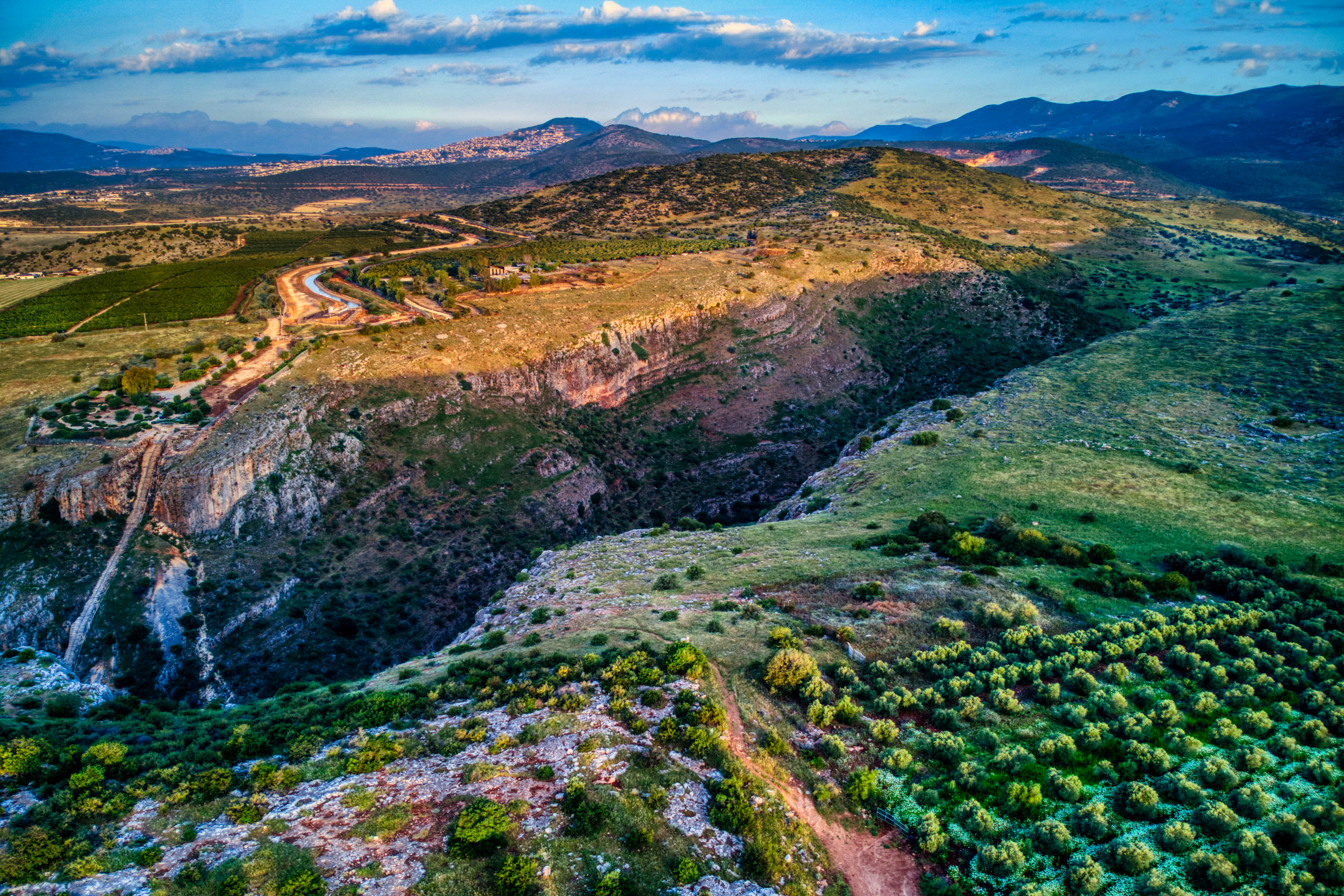
Looking north from Nahal Amud lookout

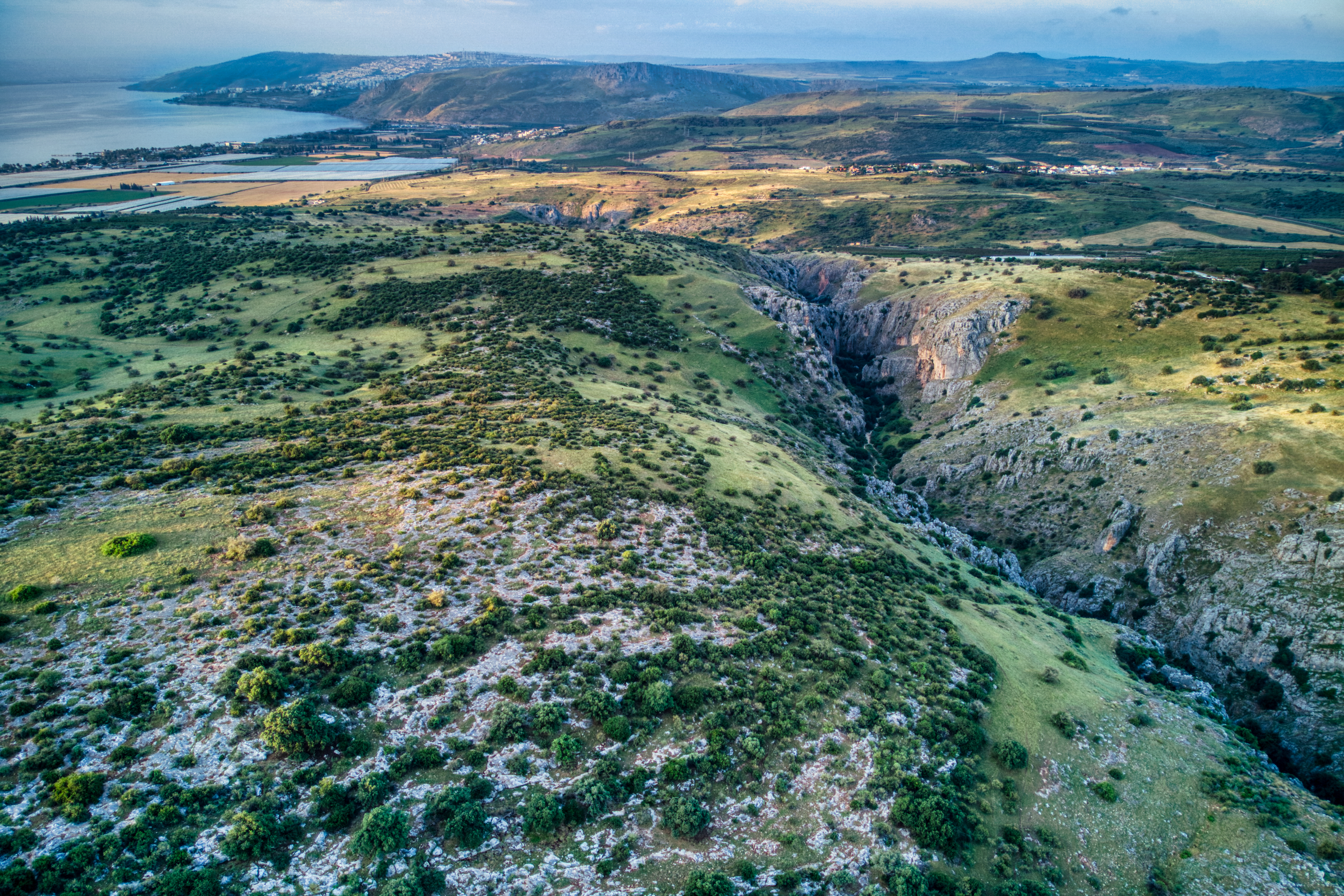
Looking south from Nahal Amud lookout

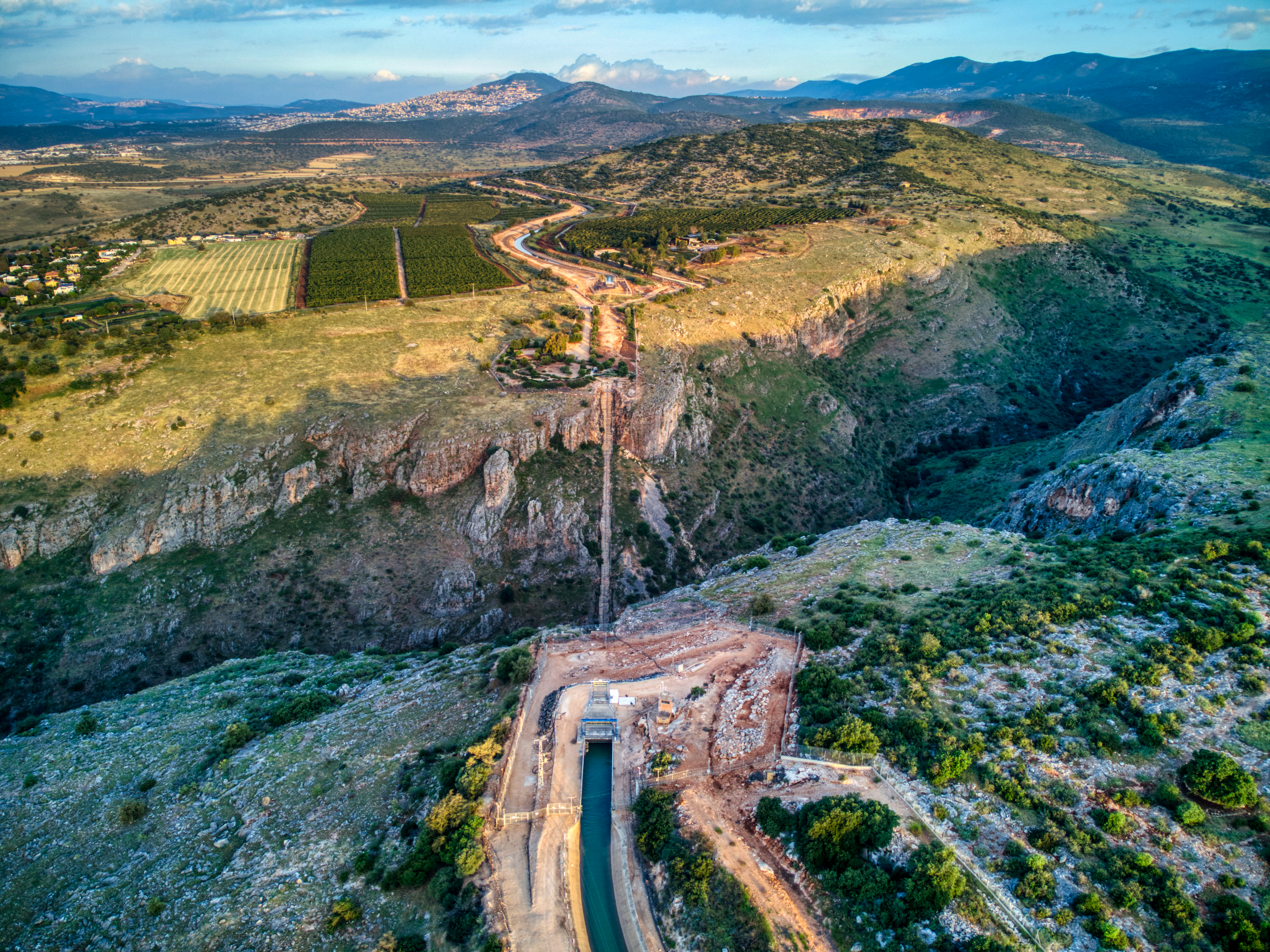
Water flows from the open Canal of the National Water Carrier of Israel into the inverted siphon in Nahal Amud and to the open canal on the other side

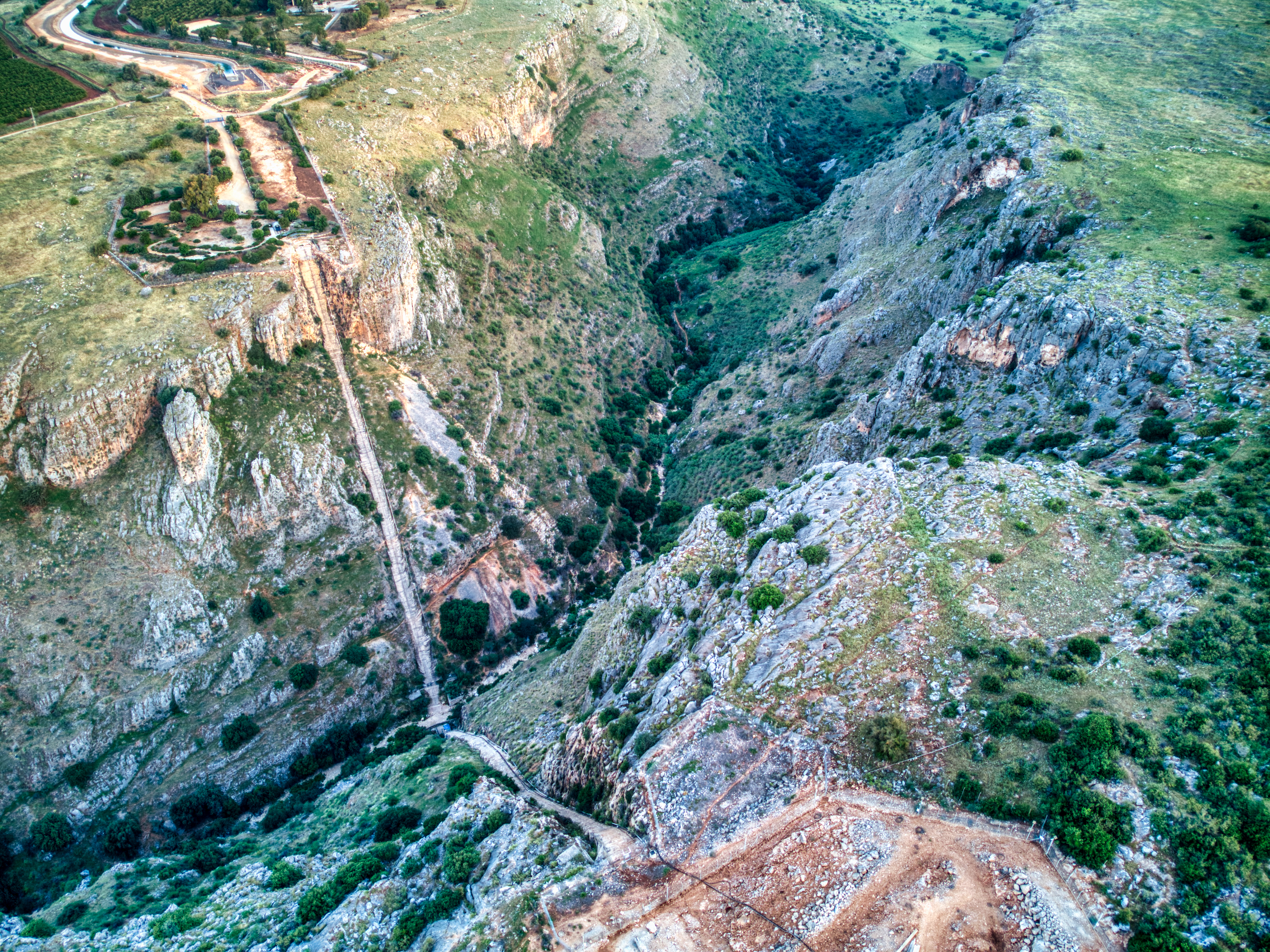
The inverted siphon in Nahal Amud

== See also ==
- Geography of Israel
- Hiking in Israel
- Archaeology of Israel
- Amud 1
