= John Solecki =

United Nations official

- Occupation: United Nations High Commissioner for Refugees (UNHCR)
- Parents: Ralph Solecki (father); Rose Solecki (mother)

John Solecki was the head of United Nations High Commissioner for Refugees (UNHCR) office in the Pakistani city of Quetta. Solecki had been working in Balochistan to help the Afghan refugees, the communities hosting them and the local people affected by floods and earthquakes.

== Kidnapping and aftermath ==
On February 2, 2009, he was kidnapped by a Baloch terrorist group named Balochistan Liberation United Front (BLUF). His driver, Syed Hashim, was shot and later he died at a local hospital. Solecki was held as a hostage by BLUF for 61 days. While he was in their captivity, BLUF had repeatedly threatened to behead him.

Following the abduction of Solecki, United Nation Resident Representative, Fikret Akcura, disclosed that Brahumdagh Bugti had connections with the abduction of UN official John Solecki in 2009. Similarly, United Nations Special Representative to Afghanistan, Kai Eide, called the then President of Afghanistan Hamid Karzai. President Karzai admitted that Brahumdagh Bugti was in Kabul and that he will pressure Brahumdagh Bugti for the safe release of John Solecki. Pakistan Interior Minister Rehman Malik also believed that Brahumdagh Bugti was behind the kidnapping of Solecki.

Solecki was eventually released on April 4, 2009.

John Solecki is the son of American archaeologists Ralph Solecki and Rose Solecki.

== See also ==
- List of kidnappings
- List of solved missing person cases (post-2000)
