= Soletsky =

Soletsky (masculine), Soletskaya (feminine), or Soletskoye (neuter) may refer to:

- Soletsky District, a district of Novgorod Oblast, Russia
- Soletskoye Urban Settlement, the town of district significance of Soltsy, incorporated as municipal formation within Soletsky District
