= Solina =

Solina may refer to:

== Places ==
- Solina, Poland, a village
- Gmina Solina, an administrative district in Poland
- Lake Solina in Poland
- Solina Dam in Poland
- Solina, Ontario, a village within the Municipality of Clarington
- Solina, Tuzla, a village

== People ==
- Solina Chau (born c. 1961), a businesswoman in Hong Kong
- Solina Nyirahabimana, a Rwandan diplomat and politician
- Franc Solina, a Slovenian computer scientist and university professor

== Other ==
- ARP String Ensemble, a polyphonic multi-orchestral synthesizer
- Antiblemma solina, a moth
- Solina, a 2016 album by Lala Karmela
