= Saccopastore skulls =

Hominin fossil

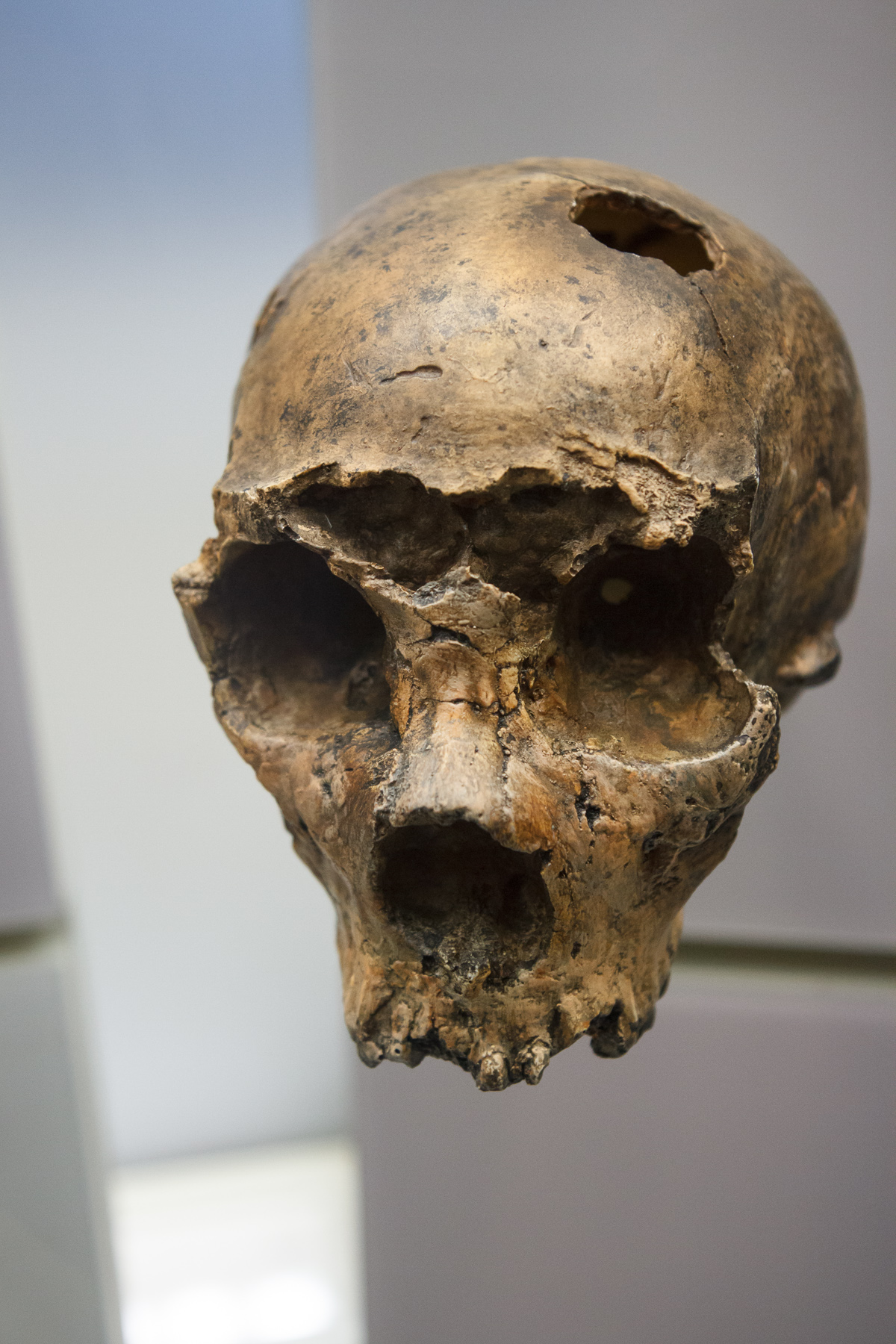
Cast of Saccopastore 1 skull at the National Museum of Natural History

Two fossil crania were discovered along the Aniene River Valley of Northern Rome, Italy in 1929 and 1935. The two human skulls that derive from Homo neanderthalensis were located in a quarry along the Aniene River in gravel and sand beds that have since been replaced by building areas with the city. From geomorphological classification, the two skulls were assigned to the Tyrrhenian stage due to their location within a small hill approximately 5 meters above the river. The area in which they were found at the time was called Saccopastore, which is where these two crania get their name. The first Saccopastore skull, discovered by Sergio Sergi, and the second Saccopastore skull, discovered by Professors Henri Breuil and Alberto Carlo Blanc, both show greater basicranial flexion compared to those of the Wurmian Neandertals, due to the extreme inclination of the planum sphenoidalis. The skulls' ages likely ranges from 100,000 to 300,000 years, and they show an extremely high level of fossilisation. After being discovered, the skulls were kept at the Institute of Anthropology of the University of Rome until World War II, when they were taken by Professor Sergio Sergi to be preserved and kept safe from German officers who were seeking fossil treasures. After a time, they stayed with Sergi and became part of his own private collection.

In 2015, the fossils were re-dated and found to be much earlier than previously thought. The new study concluded that the fossils should be dated to around 250,000 years ago, pushing back their age by over 100,000 years and thus surpassing Altamura Man as the earliest evidence for Neanderthals in Italy. The new study was a collaborative effort conducted by geologists from the National Institute of Geophysics and Volcanology working in collaboration with anthropologists and paleontologists from Sapienza University and the University of Wisconsin. This new dating is in line with the perceived age of the eleven stone artifacts found alongside the Saccopastore fossils, which were thought to have been older than the previously assessed date for the fossils.

== Saccopastore 1 ==
In April 1929, workmen of the quarry located near the Aniene River discovered a human cranium that looked to be fossilized. The skull was immediately delivered to Sergio Sergi, who began a long series of studies on the fossil. The Saccopastore skull was labeled a mature female. It is almost completely intact and overall shows a high degree of mineralization, even though it is missing both of the zygomatic arches and the mandible. After being discovered, the skull had taken damage by the workmen within the quarry. This included a number of dental crowns being broken and lost, along with some other damage to the supraorbital area and two holes punctured into the frontal and parietal areas of the vault.

== Saccopastore 2 ==
In the summer of 1935, A.C. Blanc and H. Breuil discovered another, less complete cranium in the same area where the first skull was found in 1929. The second Saccopastore skull is identified as a male and is lacking the entire vault, along with the left front orbital areas, and part of the base. Morphological differences between the two skulls are the result of sexual dimorphism because one is a mature female, and the other is a young adult male. The skull has a cranial capacity estimated around 1,280 and 1,300 ml, and the facial size is smaller than that of a Wurmian Neandertal's, but larger than the first Saccopastore skull.
