= Thomas Dale Stewart (anthropologist) =

Forensic anthropologist

T. Dale Stewart
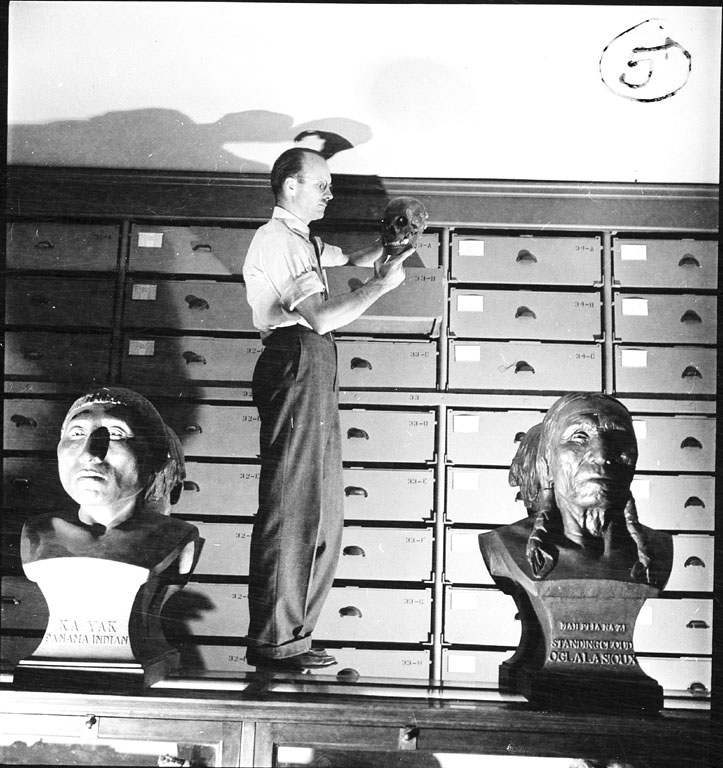
- Stewart in October 1950
- Born: June 10, 1901; Delta, Pennsylvania, U.S
- Died: October 27, 1997 (aged 96); Bethesda, Maryland, U.S
- Education: Doctor of Medicine, 1931; Johns Hopkins University
- Scientific career
- Fields: Forensic Anthropology; Physical Anthropology
- Institutions: Smithsonian Institution

Thomas Dale Stewart (June 10, 1901 – October 27, 1997) was a founder of modern forensic anthropology and a major contributor to most areas of human skeletal biology, paleopathology, and related areas of physical anthropology.

Stewart was known to have a more even temperament than his mentor, Aleš Hrdlička. He began his career in 1927 as an aid to Hrdlička in the Division of Physical Anthropology of the United States National Museum at the Smithsonian Institution in Washington, D.C., and advanced to curator of the division in 1942 and to Head Curator of the Department of Anthropology in 1961.

In 1963, Stewart was appointed Director of the National Museum of Natural History and also served as Acting Assistant Secretary for Science in 1964. He retired from administration in 1966 to pursue his research as a senior anthropologist. Upon his retirement in 1971, he was appointed anthropologist emeritus.
