= Dederiyeh Cave =

Prehistoric archaeological site in Syria

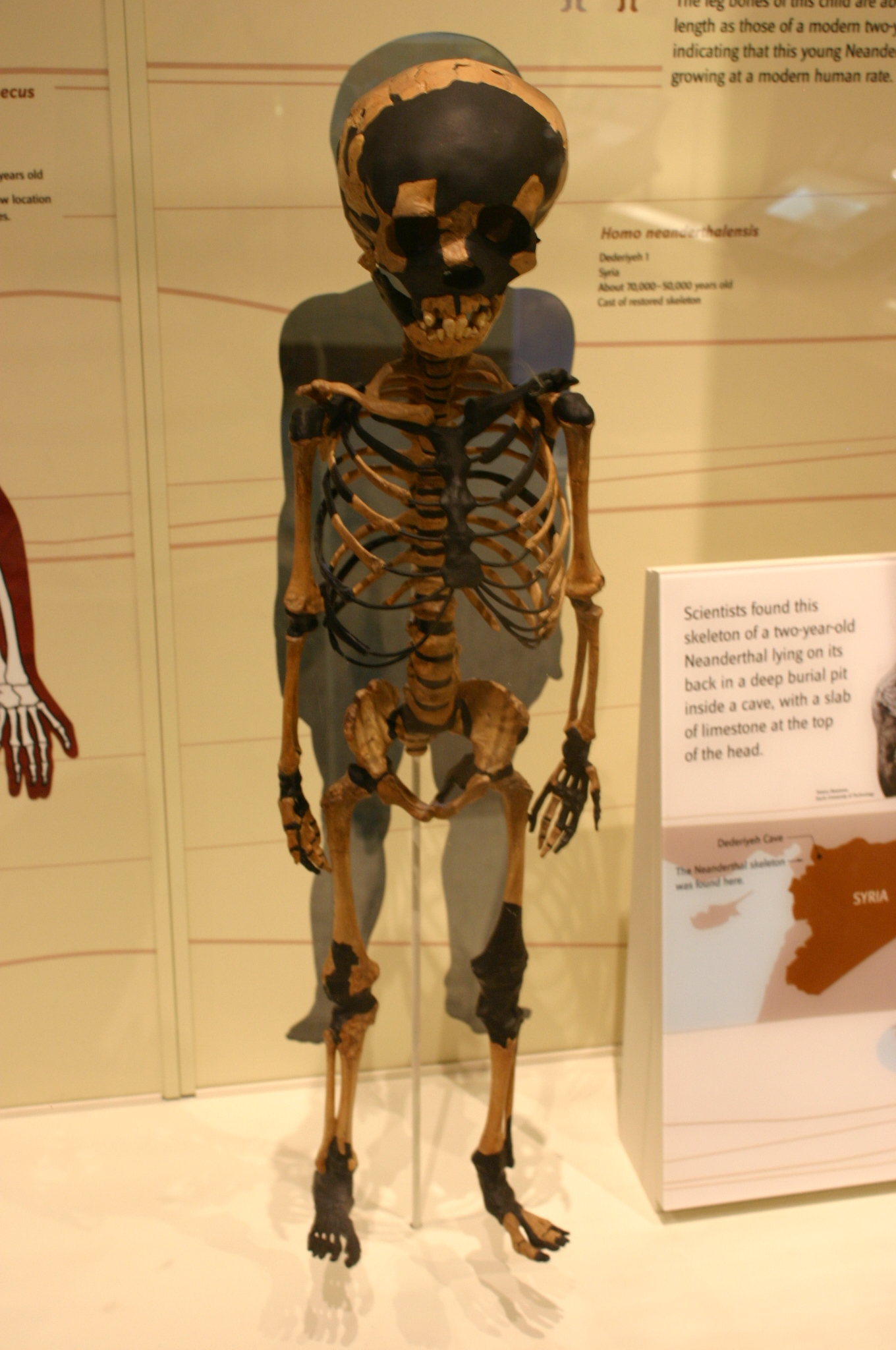
- Dederiyeh 1.Two-year-old Neanderthal, dated 70 kya-50 kya

- Location in Syria
- 36°24′00″N 36°52′00″E
- Periods: Middle Paleolithic
- Associated with: Neanderthal
- Location: Afrin
- Region: Syria

Site notes
- Height: 450 m (1,480 ft)
- Excavation dates: 1987
- Archaeologists: Takeru Akazawa, Sultan Muhesen

Dederiyeh Cave (Arabic: مغارة الديدرية, Kurdish: Şkefta Duderî) is a cave in Mount Simeon, Syria, in which systematic excavations have taken place since 1987. The cave is located 60 kilometers northwest of Aleppo in the Afrin District, on the left bank of a wadi, at an altitude of 450 metres (1,480 ft). Two Neanderthal children were found in the cave, in 1993 and 1997–1998, both of which showed evidence that they were buried.

== Description ==
The cave consists of a chamber, 15 meters wide and 8 meters high, rising up to 10 meters in the back where a chimney is a second exit, and 50 meters deep. The main entrance is north and overlooks the wadi.

== Excavations ==
Tentative excavations took place in 1989 and 1990, and more serious research started in 1993; it quickly yielded the remains of a Neanderthal child, about two years old, an almost complete set of remains. A second (partial) skeleton was found in 1997–1998, in a pit of 70x50 cm, filled with fine brown dirt in which flint were found. The researchers concluded that this also was intentionally buried.

In all the remains of up to fifteen individuals have been found in the Middle Paleolithic layers of the cave. More than half of them were children.

=== Animal Remains ===
In the lower layers, the animal remains were predominantly from wild sheep and goats. In the upper layers, other animals such as deer, boar and aurochs were more common, indicating a warmer, more humid climate.

== See also ==
- Fossil
- List of fossil sites (with link directory)
- List of human evolution fossils (with images)
