= Erik Trinkaus =

American archaeologist

- Occupation: Paleoanthropologist
- Title: Mary Tileston Hemenway Professor Emeritus of Arts and Sciences at Washington University in St. Louis

Academic background
- Education: University of Wisconsin–Madison; University of Pennsylvania
- Thesis: A Functional Analysis of the Neandertal Foot (1975)

Academic work
- Discipline: Anthropologist
- Institutions: Harvard University; University of New Mexico; Washington University in St. Louis

Erik Trinkaus (born December 24, 1948) is an American paleoanthropologist. Trinkaus is a member of the National Academy of Sciences, and the Mary Tileston Hemenway Professor Emeritus of Arts and Sciences at Washington University in St. Louis.

Specializing in Neandertal, early modern human biology and human evolution, Trinkaus researches the evolution of the species Homo sapiens and recent human diversity, focusing on the paleoanthropology and emergence of late archaic and early modern humans, and the subsequent evolution of anatomically modern humanity. He is a frequent contributor to publications such as Science, Proceedings of the National Academy of Sciences, PLOS One, American Journal of Physical Anthropology, and the Journal of Human Evolution and has written/co-written or edited/co-edited fifteen books in paleoanthropology. He is frequently quoted in the popular media.

== Education ==
Trinkaus received his Bachelor of Arts degree in Art History from the University of Wisconsin–Madison (1970), and his master's and PhD degrees in Anthropology from the University of Pennsylvania, the latter in 1975.

== Career ==
Trinkaus has taught at Harvard University, University of New Mexico and in the Arts and Sciences at Washington University in St. Louis.

== Scientific views ==
Trinkaus has been concerned primarily with the biology and behavior of Neandertals and early modern humans through the Middle and Late Pleistocene, in order to shed light on these past humans and to understand the emergence and establishment of modern humans. His work therefore has been primarily concerned with the comparative and functional anatomy, paleopathology, and life history of these past humans. At the same time, because it dominates paleoanthropology, he has been involved in debates concerning the ancestry of modern humans, being one of the first to argue for an African origin of modern humans but with substantial Neandertal ancestry among modern Eurasian human populations.

Although his early work emphasized differences between the Neandertals (and other archaic humans) and early modern humans, his work since the 1990s has documented many similarities across these human groups in terms of function, levels of activity and stress, and abilities to cope socially with the rigors of a Pleistocene foraging existence. His research therefore involves the biomechanical analysis of cranio-facial and post-cranial remains, patterns of tooth wear, interpretations of ecogeographical patterning, life history parameters (growth and mortality), differential levels and patterns of stress (paleopathology), issues of survival, and the interrelationships between these patterns.

== Research projects ==
Trinkaus has conducted a series of comparative analyses, with colleagues and students, on the regional functional anatomy of Neandertals and other Pleistocene humans. He has contributed to the direct radiocarbon dating of original human fossils, and through that work to insights into their diets through the analysis of carbon (C) and nitrogen (N) stable isotopes. He has been involved in the primary paleontological descriptions of a number of Middle and Late Pleistocene human remains, of both archaic and early modern humans. The first project was his monograph on the Shanidar Neandertals from Iraqi Kurdistan. Subsequent major projects concerned with early modern humans include the Abrigo do Lagar Velho (Portugal) Dolní Věstonice and Pavlov Moravia, Czech Republic, Peştera cu Oase (Romania), Peştera Muierii (Romania), Mladeč (Czech Republic), Tianyuandong (China), and Sunghir (Russia). Additional Neandertal descriptions include those from Krapina (Croatia), Oliveira (Portugal), Kiik-Koba (Crimea), and Sima de las Palomas (Spain). To these can be added Middle Pleistocene human remains from Aubesier (France), Broken Hill (Zambia), and Hualongdong (China), plus late archaic humans remains from Xujiayao and Xuchang (China). These paleontological descriptions include both primary data on these fossils and a diversity of paleobiological interpretations of the remains and the Pleistocene human groups from which they derive.

Trinkaus's analyses of early modern human remains, especially those from Dolní Věstonice, Pavlov, Lagar Velho and Sunghir, have raised a series of questions regarding the nature and diversity of mortuary practices among these early modern humans. And his paleopathological analyses of Pleistocene human remains have raised questions concerning the levels and natures of trauma and developmental abnormalities among these people.
