= Minimum number of individuals =

Archaeology term

In disciplines including forensic anthropology, bioarchaeology, osteoarchaeology, Paleontology and zooarchaeology Minimum number of individuals, or MNI, refers to the fewest possible number of people or animals in a skeletal assemblage. It is used to determine an estimate of how many people or animals are present in a cluster of bones.

The principle of the minimum number of individuals was defined by the North American ethnologist T. E. White in 1953.

The principle of MNI accounts for each possible individual human or animal as an individual unit in the most parsimonious way, meaning to count the lowest number of individuals in an archaeological site.

While there are formulae that can be applied to determining MNI, it is essentially a logic game. If there were two femurs, a left and a right, then the MNI=1. If there were two left femurs then the MNI=2. If there are three examples of a right humerus, then obviously that implies there were at least three individuals. If those all three happen to be male, and there is a clearly female skull, then that adds one more to the MNI, and so on.

An MNI of three might call into question a grave's designation as a mass grave, even though it could have more than three individuals. However, an MNI of 10 could strengthen a legal case or provide additional context for archaeological excavation.

Along with the acronym 'MNI' is frequently found 'AFO' which stands for "associated funerary objects".

For more information on the applications of determining MNI, refer to bioarchaeology, forensic anthropology, osteology, or zooarchaeology.
