= Shanidar Cave =

Iraqi- Kurdish site of Neanderthal remains

- ئەشکەوتی شانەدەر (Kurdish)
- Shanadar Cave
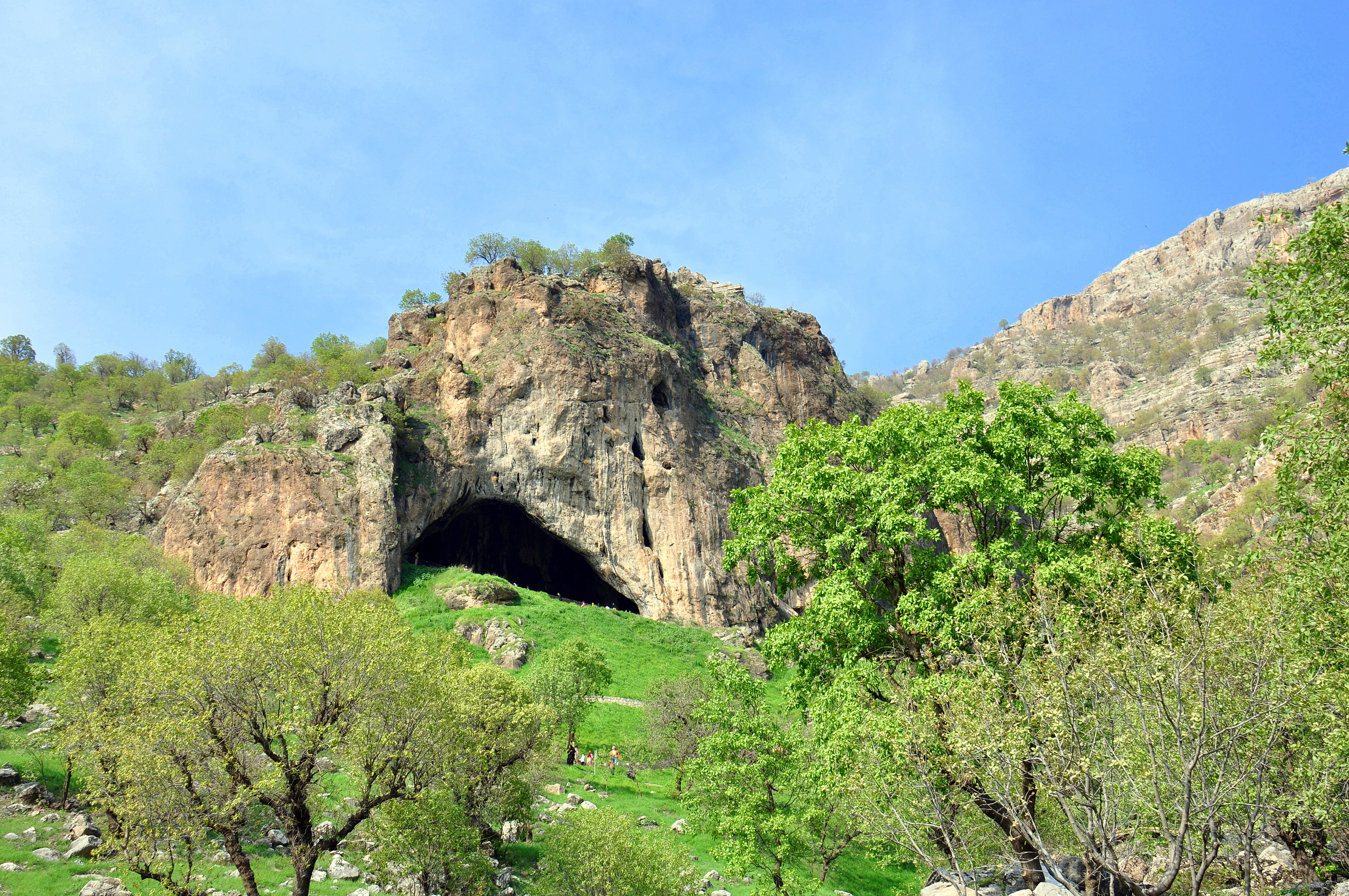
- The entrance to Shanidar Cave

- location in Middle East
- 36.831593°N 44.221083°E
- Location: Erbil Governorate, Kurdistan Region, Iraq
- Region: Zagros Mountains

Shanidar Cave (Kurdish: ئەشکەوتی شانەدەر, romanized: Eşkewtî Şaneder, Arabic: كَهَف شانِدَر) is an archaeological site on Bradost Mountain, within the Zagros Mountains in the Erbil Governorate of Kurdistan Region in northern Iraq. Neanderthal remains were discovered here in 1953, including Shanidar 1, who survived several injuries, possibly due to care from others in his group, and Shanidar 4, the famed supposed 'flower burial', where pollen has been suggested to be the remnants of deliberately placed flowers. Until this discovery, Cro-Magnons, the earliest known H. sapiens in Europe, were the only individuals known for purposeful, ritualistic burials. However, this has been questioned, with it being suggested that the pollen over the burial may be the result of natural processes such as bee accumulation.

== Archaeology ==
The Shanidar Cave site is located near Barzan, positioned about 0.5 miles (800 m) from the Great Zab river, and situated at an elevation of 2,100 feet (640 m) above sea level. The cave’s entrance is triangular, and the portal is 82 feet (25 m) wide by 26 feet (7.9 m) high. The cave’s dimensions are 130 feet (40 m) long, 175 feet (53 m) wide, and 45 feet (14 m) high.

Anthropologist Ralph Solecki, who was part of the University of Michigan Expedition to the Near East, first explored the site with a sounding in 1951. He returned in 1953, under the auspices of the Directorate General of Antiquities of Iraq and the Smithsonian Institution, for another sounding. The first human remains, believed to be those of a Neanderthal infant from the Mousterian era of the Middle Paleolithic period, were discovered in 1953.

The next season, during 1956–57, Solecki and his team conducted soundings at two nearby village sites and continued work at the Shanidar Cave. Three Neanderthal unfossilized skeletons were found at the cave. One was nearly complete (Shanidar I - field catalog no. 504 III), one was fragmentary (Shanidar III - field catalog no. 384 III), and for one only the skull was excavated at that time (Shanidar II - field catalog no. 618 III). Archaeologists also uncovered the Neolithic remains of an infant and a female adolescent, buried with grave goods. The pair is believed to represent a mother and her child, who may have died during childbirth or due to a postpartum infection. Frequent use of explosives, up to eight sticks at a time, were employed in these excavations.

During the fourth season of 1960, a largely complete adult Neanderthal skeleton was recovered (Shanidar IV). Its state was considerably more fragile than the earlier specimens. While extracting it, the bones of another Neanderthal specimen, or possibly two, were noted and tentatively designated Shanidar VI. The former was presumed male and the latter female based on size. The badly damaged and scattered remains of one adult Neanderthal male was designated Shanidar V.

After the field material had been processed and analyzed, more Neanderthal remains were declared. Shanidar 9 was an infant represented only by vertebrae. The remains of Shanidar 9 were discovered during the removal of Shanidar 4 when encasing it in sediment block and transporting it to the Baghdad Museum. Shanidar 8 was an adult with a partial fragmentary skeleton. Shanidar 6 and 7 were skull, teeth and partial skeleton, all fragmentary. Shanidar 1, 2, 3, 5, and 7 were found as individual burials, while the other remains were found in a single compressed block.

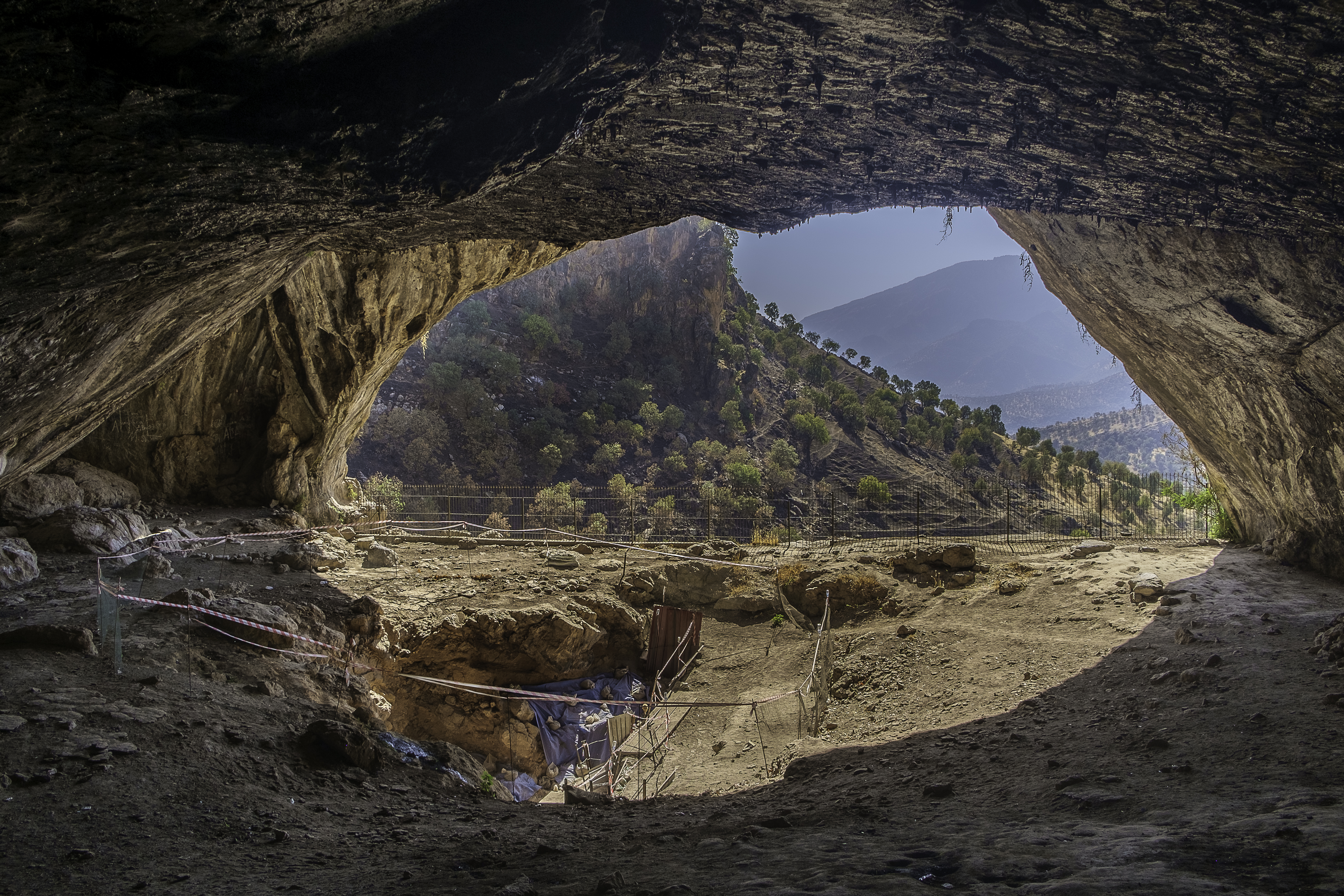
Inside the Shanidar Cave

Overall these excavations found the remains of seven adult and two infants Neanderthals, dating from around 65,000–35,000 years ago. These individuals were uncovered amongst a Mousterian layer (layer D), overlaid by a Baradostian culture layer (layer C), a Mesolithic Zarzian layer (layer B) and a Holocene Neolithic layer (layer A), accompanied by various stone tools and animal remains. The cave also contains two later proto-Neolithic cemeteries, one of which dates back about 10,600 BCE and contains 35 individuals, and is considered by Solecki to belong to the Natufian culture. Also, in 2018, Shanidar-11 and Shanidar-12 were discovered.

=== Recent work ===
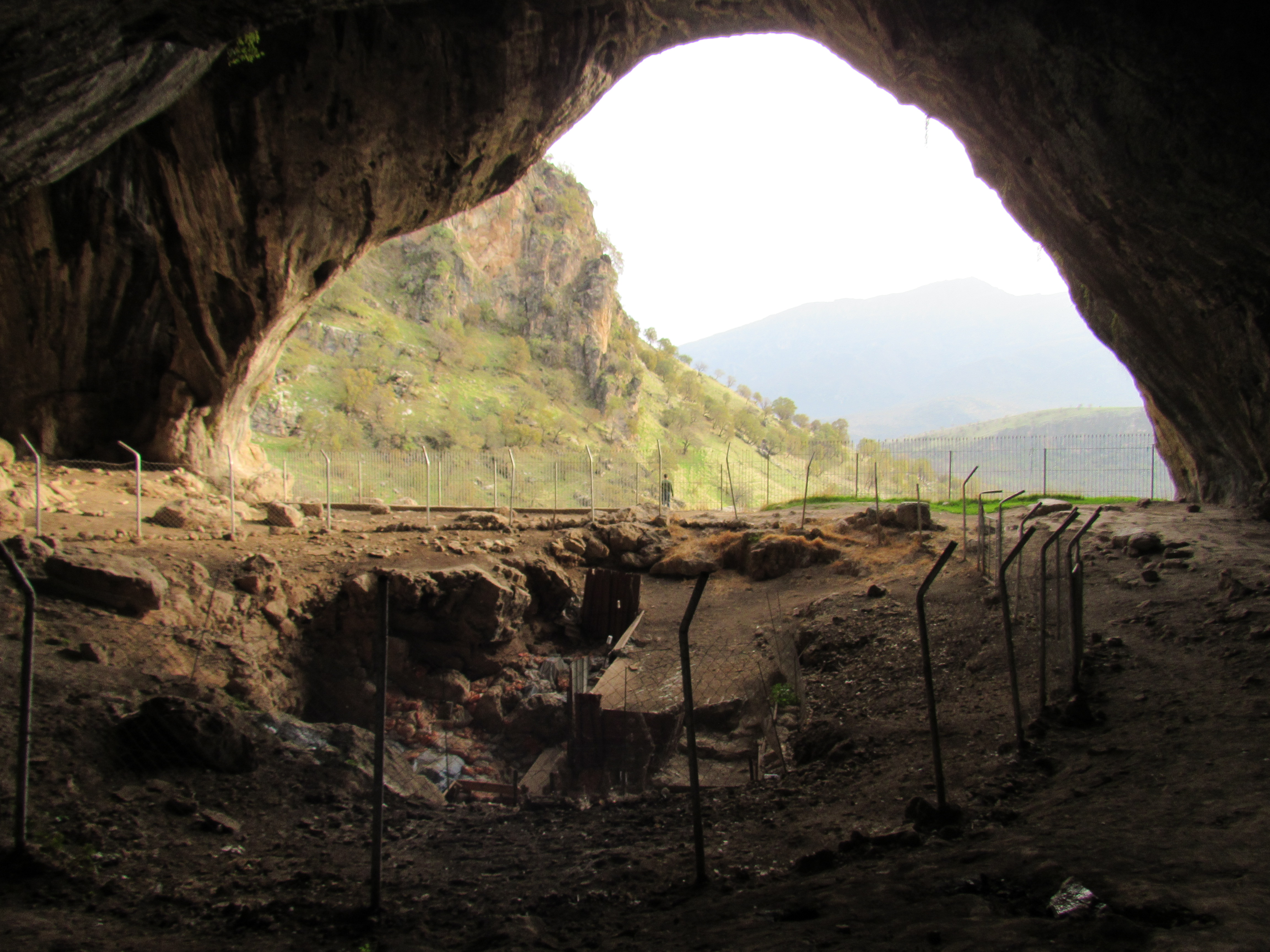
Shanidar Cave in 2020

Investigations were conducted in 2014-2015 under the auspices of the Kurdistan Directorate of Antiquities. The remains found in the Shanidar cave are being reexamined to analyze the mortuary activity of the Neanderthal people who inhabited this area. There are various signs of activity with the remains after death being that the position of the skull and mandible of Shanidar 1 were not natural. Examinations of other sites will be integral in understanding and analyzing the activity of the remains after death of those found in the Shanidar cave. Additional work is being conducted on the faunal remains found in Layer D at the University of Chicago to analyze butchery activity. Many remains found had cut marks that were caused by flint items which correlates to butchery practices.

== Neanderthal remains ==
The ten Neanderthals at the site were found within a Mousterian layer which also contained hundreds of stone tools including points, side-scrapers, and flakes and bones from animals including wild goats and spur-thighed tortoises.

The first nine (Shanidar 1–9) were unearthed between 1957 and 1961 by Ralph Solecki and a team from Columbia University. The skeleton of Shanidar 3 is held at the Smithsonian Institution. The others (Shanidar 1, 2, and 4–8) were kept in Iraq and may have been lost during the 2003 invasion, although casts remain at the Smithsonian. In 2006, while sorting a collection of faunal bones from the site at the Smithsonian, Melinda Zeder discovered leg and foot bones from a tenth Neanderthal, now known as Shanidar 10.

=== Shanidar 1 ===
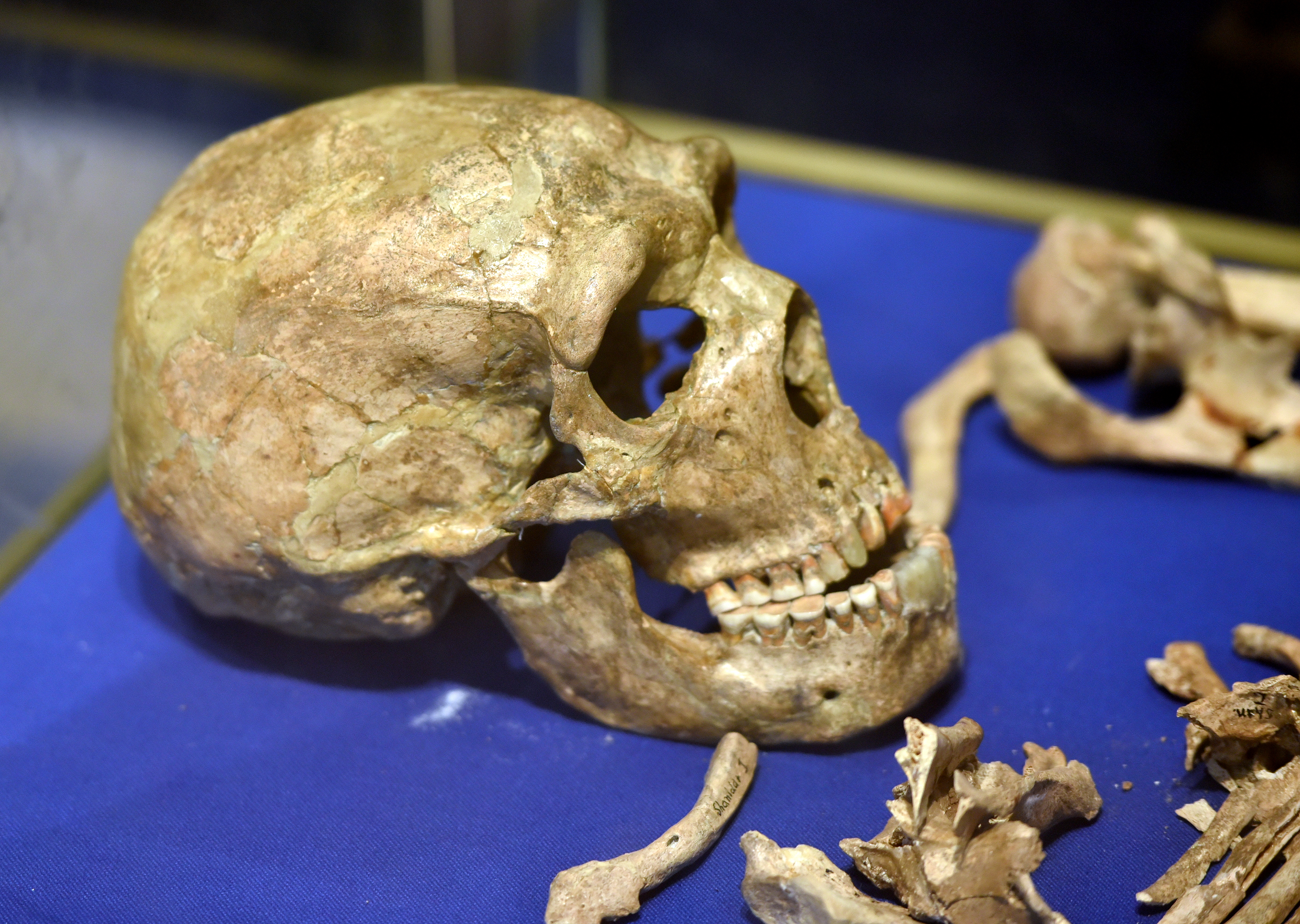
Shanidar I's skull and skeleton, c. 60,000 to 45,000 BCE. Iraq Museum

Shanidar 1 was an elderly Neanderthal male known as 'Nandy' to his excavators. He was aged between 30 and 45 years. Shanidar 1 had a cranial capacity of 1,600 cm^{3}, was around the height of 5 feet 7 inches (170 cm), and displayed severe signs of deformity. He was one of four reasonably complete skeletons from the cave which displayed trauma-related abnormalities, which in his case would have been debilitating to the point of making day-to-day life painful.

During the course of the individual's life, he had suffered a violent blow to the left side of his face, creating a crushing fracture to his left orbit which would have left him partially or totally blind in one eye. Research by Ján Lietava shows that the individual exhibits "atypically worn teeth". Severe changes to the individual's incisors and a flattened capitulum show additional evidence towards Shanidar 1 suffering from a degenerative disease. Additionally, analysis shows that Shanidar 1 likely suffered from profound hearing loss, as his left ear canal was partially blocked and his right ear canal was completely blocked by exostoses. He also suffered from a withered right arm which had been fractured in several places. A fracture of the individual's C5 vertebrae is thought to have caused damage to his muscle function (specifically the deltoids and biceps) of the right arm. Shanidar 1 healed, but this caused the loss of his lower arm and hand. This is thought to be either congenital, a result of childhood disease and trauma, or due to an amputation later in his life. The sharp point caused by a distal fracture of the individual's right humerus points towards this theory of amputation. If the arm was amputated, this demonstrates one of the earliest signs of surgery on a living individual. The arm had healed, but the injury may have caused some paralysis down his right side, leading to deformities in his lower legs and feet. Studies show that this individual had suffered from two broken legs. This would have resulted in him walking with a pronounced, painful limp. These findings in Shanidar 1's skeleton propose that he was unlikely to be able to provide for himself in a Neanderthal society.

More recent analysis of Shanidar 1 by Washington University Professor Erik Trinkaus and Dr. Sébastien Villotte of the French National Centre for Scientific Research confirm that bony growths in his ear canals would have resulted in extensive hearing loss. These bony growths support a diagnosis of diffuse idiopathic skeletal hyperostosis (DISH), also known as Forestier's disease. This diagnosis would make Shanidar 1 the oldest hominin specimen clearly presenting this systemic condition. The researchers found these bone growths in multiple places all over the partial skeleton.

Based on the healing of his injuries, Shanidar 1 lived with them for a substantial time before his death. Assuming that Neanderthals did perform surgery on Shanidar 1, his recovery demonstrates that their methods were successful in sustaining life. The prolonged survival of an individual with significant disabilities has also provided the basis for conjecture about Neanderthal social behavior. According to paleoanthropologist Erik Trinkaus, Shanidar 1 must have been aided by others in order to survive his injuries. Due to the chronic effects of trauma, it was unlikely that this individual could independently provide for his family, so his post-injury lifespan may imply that he was kept alive due to his high social status or valuable cultural knowledge.

This evidence has also led to speculation about Neanderthals' capacity for altruistic behavior and the presence of ethos in the Neanderthal communities. The discovery of stone tools found in proximity to these individuals demonstrates that Neanderthals exhibited the intelligence to make everyday life easier for themselves, and their cognitive ability may have surpassed basic comprehension to include characteristics such as humility and compassion commonly associated with Homo sapiens. These individuals may have exhibited empathy or attached abstract meaning to life that caused them to want to help Shanidar 1.

=== Shanidar 2 ===
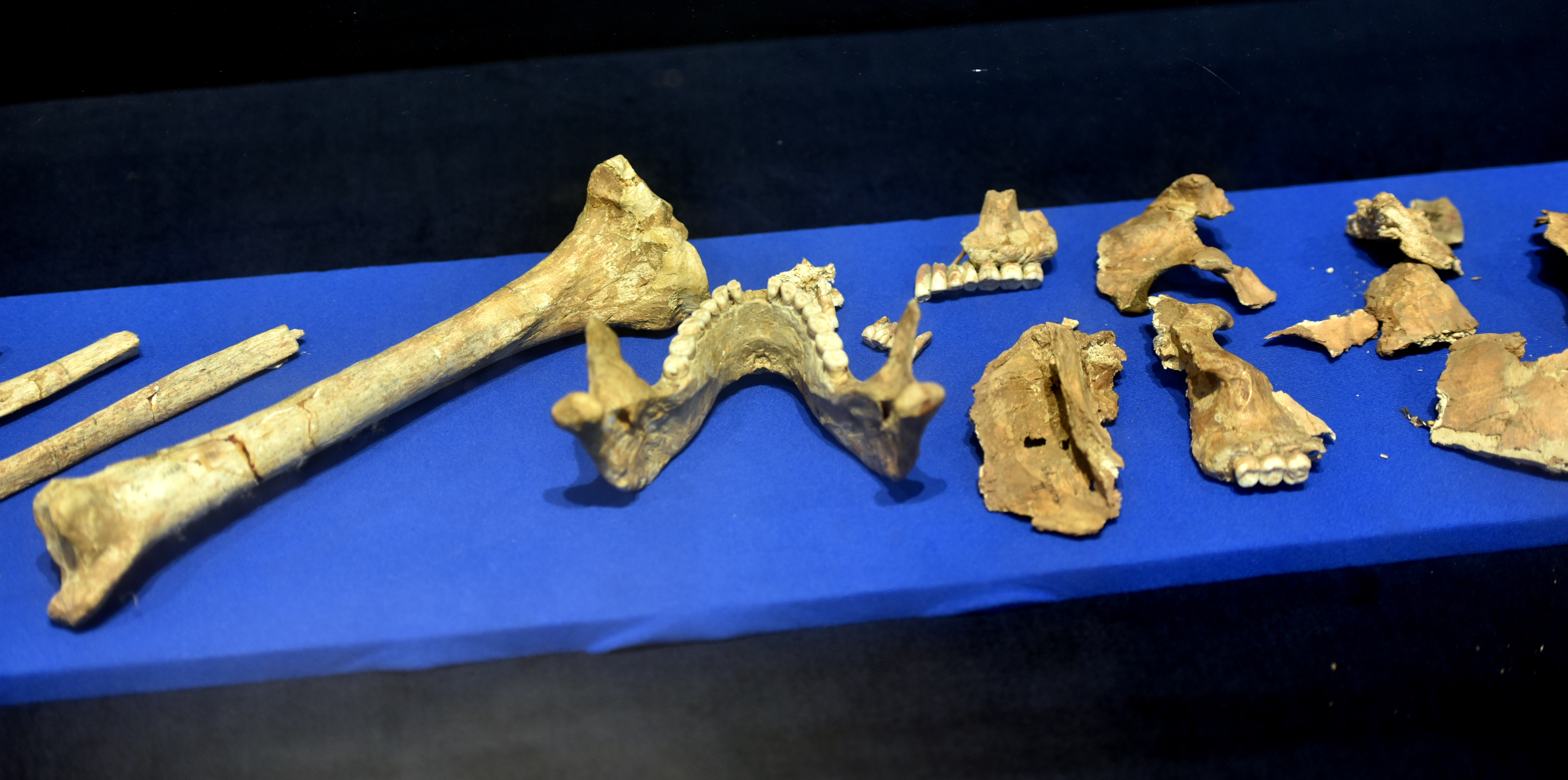
Skeletal remains of Shanidar II, c. 60,000 to 45,000 BCE. Iraq Museum

Shanidar 2 was a Neanderthal male around the age of 30 who suffered from slight arthritis, found lying on his right side. It is estimated that Shanidar 2 was 5 feet 2 inches (157 cm) in stature, which places him just below the average height of a male Neanderthal. He was killed by rocks falling from the cave's ceiling, which crushed his skull and bones significantly. The skull had been compressed by about 5–6 cm (2.0–2.4 in). Much of his bones were missing when discovered, and the left tibia had teeth marks. Scavengers likely disposed of parts of his remains. There is evidence that Shanidar 2 was given a ritual send-off: a small pile of stones with some worked stone points (made out of chert) were found on top of his grave. Also, there had been a large fire by the burial site.

Shanidar 2 had a "higher cranial vault", and other skull proportions that did not quite match up to the average Neanderthal skull. This may prove that the Neanderthals of Shanidar had more of a "morphology of anatomically modern humans" than other Neanderthals, or that the group was very diverse. This points to similarities between the two species, Neanderthals and Homo sapiens, but it does not show any inherited "relationships within that species".

=== Shanidar 3 ===
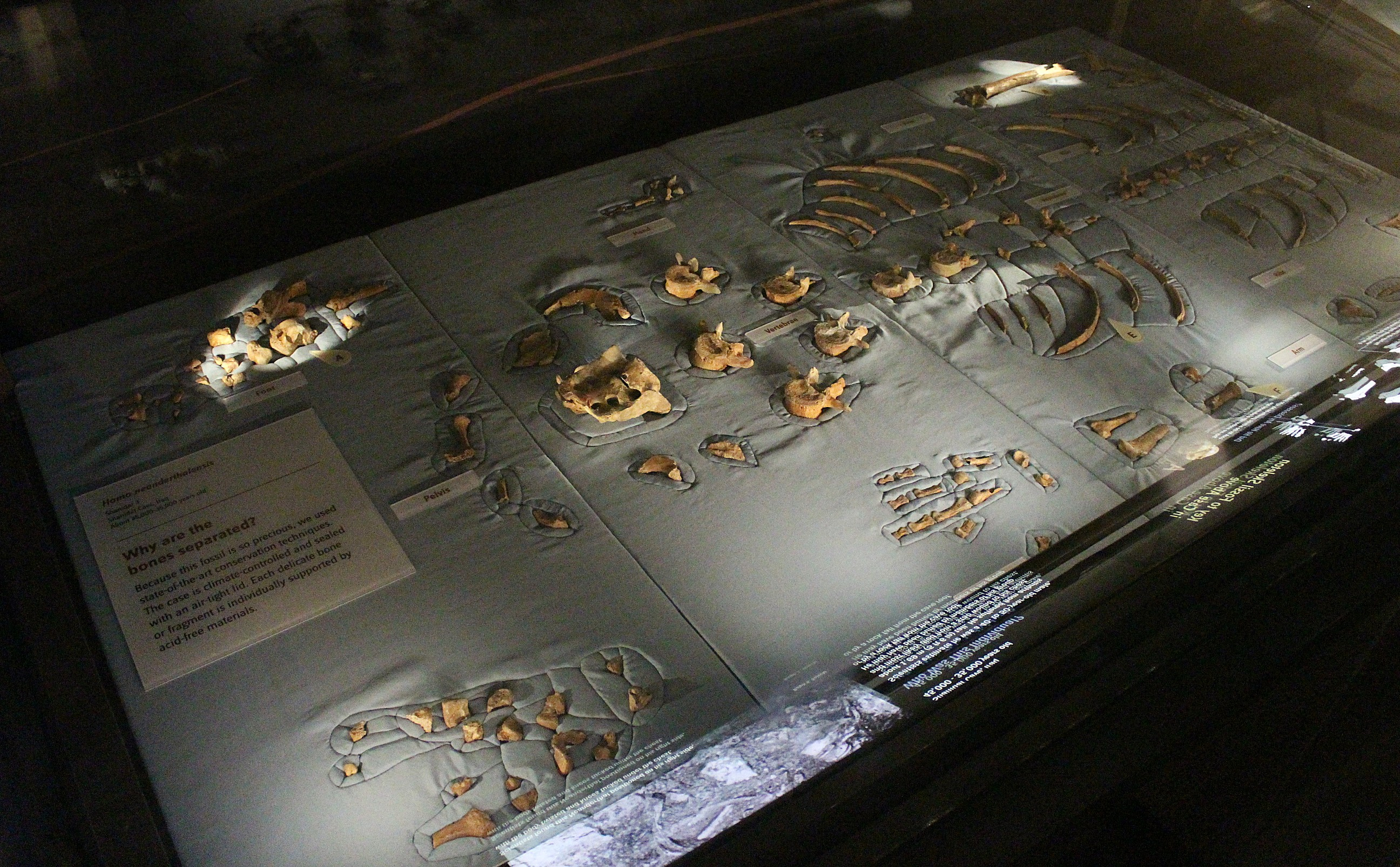
Skeleton of Shanidar 3, National Museum of Natural History

Shanidar 3 was a 40- to 50-year-old male, found in the same grave as Shanidar 1 and 2. A wound to the left ninth rib suggests that the individual died of complications from a stab wound by a sharp implement. Bone growth around the wound indicates that Shanidar 3 lived for at least several weeks after the injury with the object still embedded. The angle of the wound rules out self-infliction, but is consistent with an accidental or purposeful stabbing by another individual. Recent research has suggested that the injury may have been caused by a long range projectile. This would be the earliest example of inter-personal or inter-specific violence in the human fossil record and the only such example amongst Neanderthals. The presence of early-modern humans between 45,000 and 35,000 years ago, possibly armed with projectile weapons, in western Asia around the same time has been taken to imply that this injury may have resulted from inter-species conflict. However, spears produced by Neanderthals 300,000-400,000 years BP were likely used as projectiles. Shanidar 3 also suffered from a degenerative joint disorder in his foot resulting from a fracture or sprain, which would have resulted in painful, limited movement. The skeleton is on display at the Hall of Human Origins at the National Museum of Natural History in Washington, D.C.

=== Shanidar 4, the "flower burial" ===
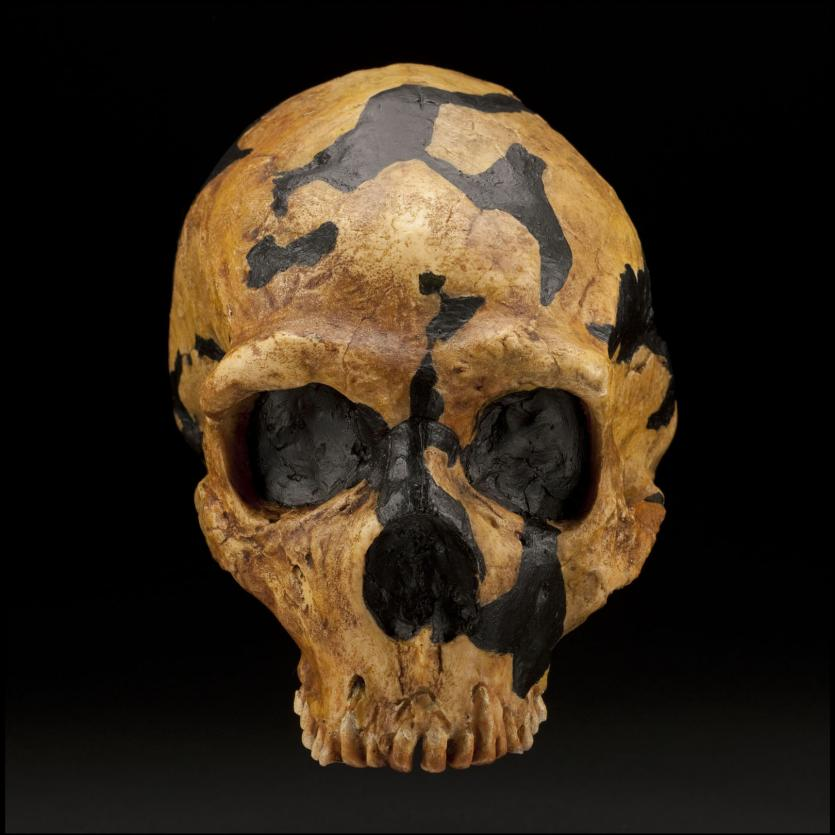
Shanidar Neanderthal skull, dated to 80,000–60,000 BP

The skeleton of Shanidar 4, an adult male aged 30–45 years, was discovered by Solecki in 1960, positioned on his left side in a partial fetal position.

For many years, Shanidar 4 was thought to provide strong evidence for a Neanderthal burial ritual. Routine soil samples from around the body, gathered for pollen analysis in an attempt to reconstruct the palaeoclimate and vegetational history of the site, were analysed eight years after its discovery. In two of the soil samples in particular, whole clumps of pollen were discovered by Arlette Leroi-Gourhan in addition to the usual pollen found throughout the site, suggesting that entire flowering plants (or at least heads of plants) had been part of the grave deposit. Furthermore, a study of the particular flower types suggested that the flowers may have been chosen for their specific medicinal properties. Yarrow, cornflower, bachelor's button, St Barnaby's thistle, ragwort, grape hyacinth, horsetail and hollyhock were represented in the pollen samples, all of which have been traditionally used, as diuretics, stimulants, and astringents and anti-inflammatories. This led to the idea that the man could have had shamanic powers, perhaps acting as medicine man to the Shanidar Neanderthals.

However, recent work has suggested that the pollen was perhaps introduced to the burial by animal action, as several burrows of a gerbil-like rodent known as the Persian jird were found nearby. The jird is known to store large numbers of seeds and flowers at certain points in their burrows and this argument was used in conjunction with the lack of ritual treatment of the rest of the skeletons in the cave to suggest that the Shanidar 4 burial had natural, not cultural, origins. Paul B. Pettitt has stated that the "deliberate placement of flowers has now been convincingly eliminated", noting that "A recent examination of the microfauna from the strata into which the grave was cut suggests that the pollen was deposited by the burrowing rodent Meriones persicus, which is common in the Shanidar microfauna and whose burrowing activity can be observed today". Despite his conclusions that flowers were unlikely to have been deliberately placed, Petitt nevertheless concludes that the Shanidar burials, because they happened over so many years, represent a deliberate mortuary practice by Neanderthals. It has also been suggested that some of the pollen was deposited by nesting solitary bees.

=== Shanidar 5 ===
Shanidar and contemporary cultures c. 50,000~40,000

The Shanidar 5 remains were found during the 1960 excavations, in layer D, about 4.5 meters (15 ft) below datum. He was an adult Neanderthal, thought to be male and around 40–50 years of age before death. He was caught in the same rockfall that killed Shanidar 2. A cranium, four teeth, one vertebra, eight ribs, and miscellaneous other bones were recovered. The arrangement of the broken skeletal remains was thought to have been due to animals intervening after death. Radiocarbon results put the date at about 46,000 before the present day. Some years later a small correction to the original cranial reconstruction was found. During the recent excavations more pieces of Shanidar 5 were found

The cranium of Shanidar 5 was reconstructed by Erik Trinkaus and his colleagues beginning 1976 and was finalized in 1994 after correcting a couple of errors caught in the process. During the process of reconstruction, there were discussions suggesting signs of intentional cranial deformation. Erik Trinkaus suggested that Shanidar 5 had its cranium deformed intentionally as an infant. However, this implication was overruled due to the fact that the curve was missing after the correction of a misplaced cranium bone fragment. Still, the frontal mid sagittal angle of this individual was very flat at 147º. The cranium shows signs of endocranial hyperostosis where plaques are found in the left and right side of the frontal crest and in the front area of sagittal sinus.

=== Shanidar Z ===
In February 2020, researchers announced the discovery of more Neanderthal remains, which dated back to more than 70,000 years ago. Analysis of the site found that Shanidar Z was laid to rest in a gully that had been formed by hand for the placement of the body. The remains of Shanidar Z were identified as a female in her mid-40s or possibly older, and she stood at about five feet tall. A facial reconstruction was also completed from skull fragments.

=== Diets discovered ===
Land snails were excavated and discovered in significant amounts and thought to be part of the Shanidar diet. It is unclear whether this diet was caused from cultural change or a change in the environment that lead to changes in previous foods as seen in the analysis of size decrease in goats. However, there are other lineages from Africa that share this diet and was culturally motivated which may indicate that the Neanderthals in the Shanidar cave may have possibly changed their diet for cultural reasons. In Layer B, dating back to approximately 12,000 years ago, Ralph S. Solecki found numerous snail shells which may indicate the Shanidar maintained this diet for some time.

== See also ==
- List of human evolution fossils
- List of Neanderthal fossils
- Neanderthals in Southwest Asia
- Paleopathology
