= Ralph Solecki =

American archaeologist (1917–2019)

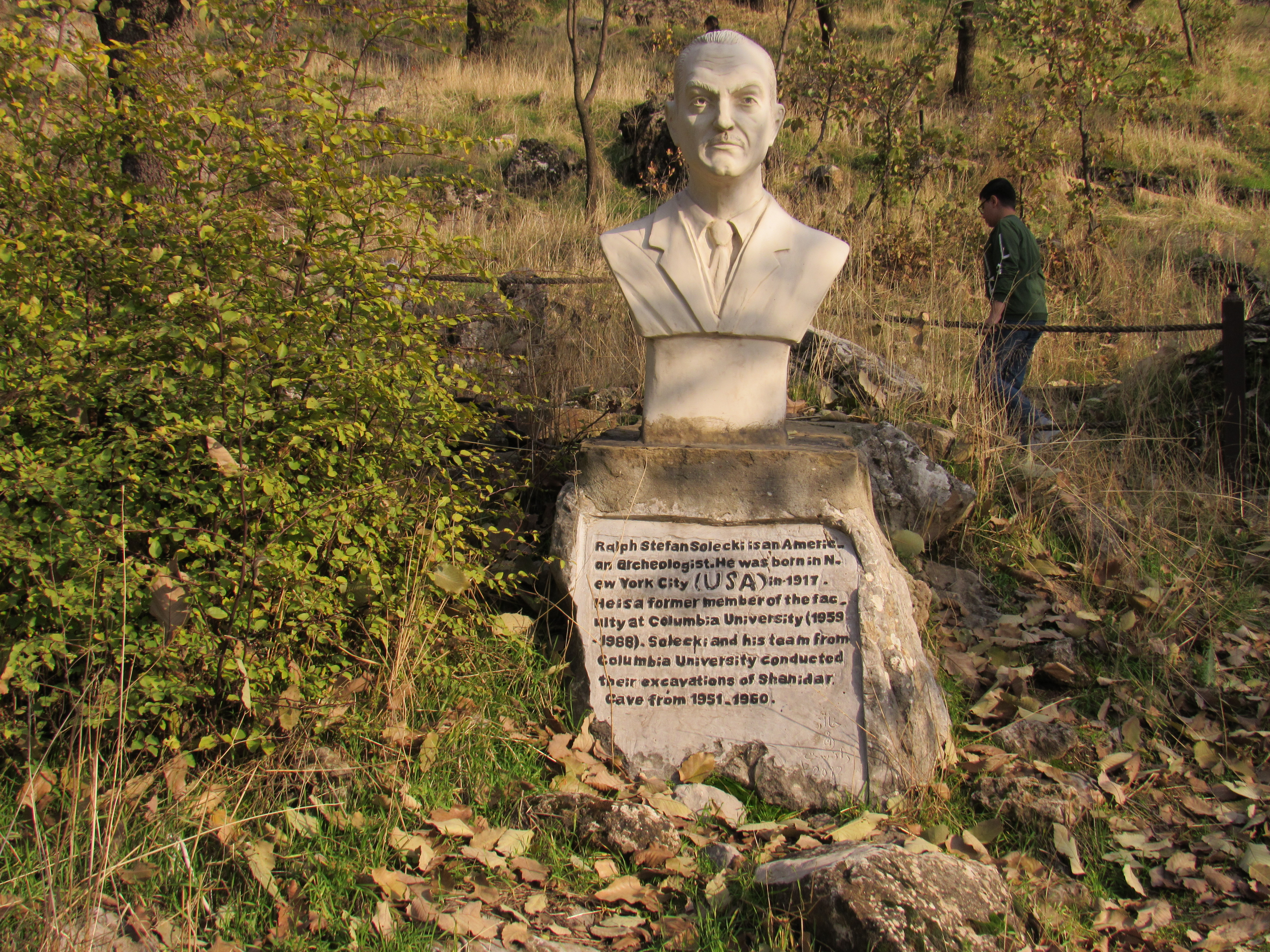
- Ralph Solecki statue at Shanidar Cave archaeological Park
- Born: October 15, 1917; Brooklyn, New York City, U.S.
- Died: March 20, 2019 (aged 101); Livingston, New Jersey, U.S.
- Occupation: Archaeologist
- Spouse: Rose Solecki
- Relatives: John Solecki, William Solecki (sons)

Ralph Stefan Solecki (October 15, 1917 – March 20, 2019) was an American archaeologist. Solecki was born in Brooklyn, New York, in October 1917, the son of Polish immigrants: Mary (née Tarnowska), a homemaker; and Casimir, an insurance salesman.

Solecki graduated from the City College of New York in 1942. He then served in the U.S. Army in Europe and was wounded when he stepped on a land mine. After the war he did his graduate work at Columbia University.

From 1959 to 1988, he was a member of the faculty at Columbia University. His best-known excavations were at the Neanderthal site at Shanidar Cave, in the Kurdistan Region of Iraq. His publications include early works on aerial photography and photo-interpretation as well as two volumes on Shanidar (1971, 1972).

He was married to fellow archaeologist Rose Solecki, and they were the parents of American geographer William Solecki and UNHCR official John Solecki. In 2013, he was interviewed about his work by The Wall Street Journal. He died on March 20, 2019, at the age of 101.

== See also ==
- List of fossil sites (with link directory)
- List of hominina (hominid) fossils (with images)
