= History of Croatia before the Croats =

Period until the 7th century

The area known as Croatia today has been inhabited throughout the prehistoric period, ever since the Stone Age, up to the Migrations Period and the arrival of the White Croats.

== Prehistory ==
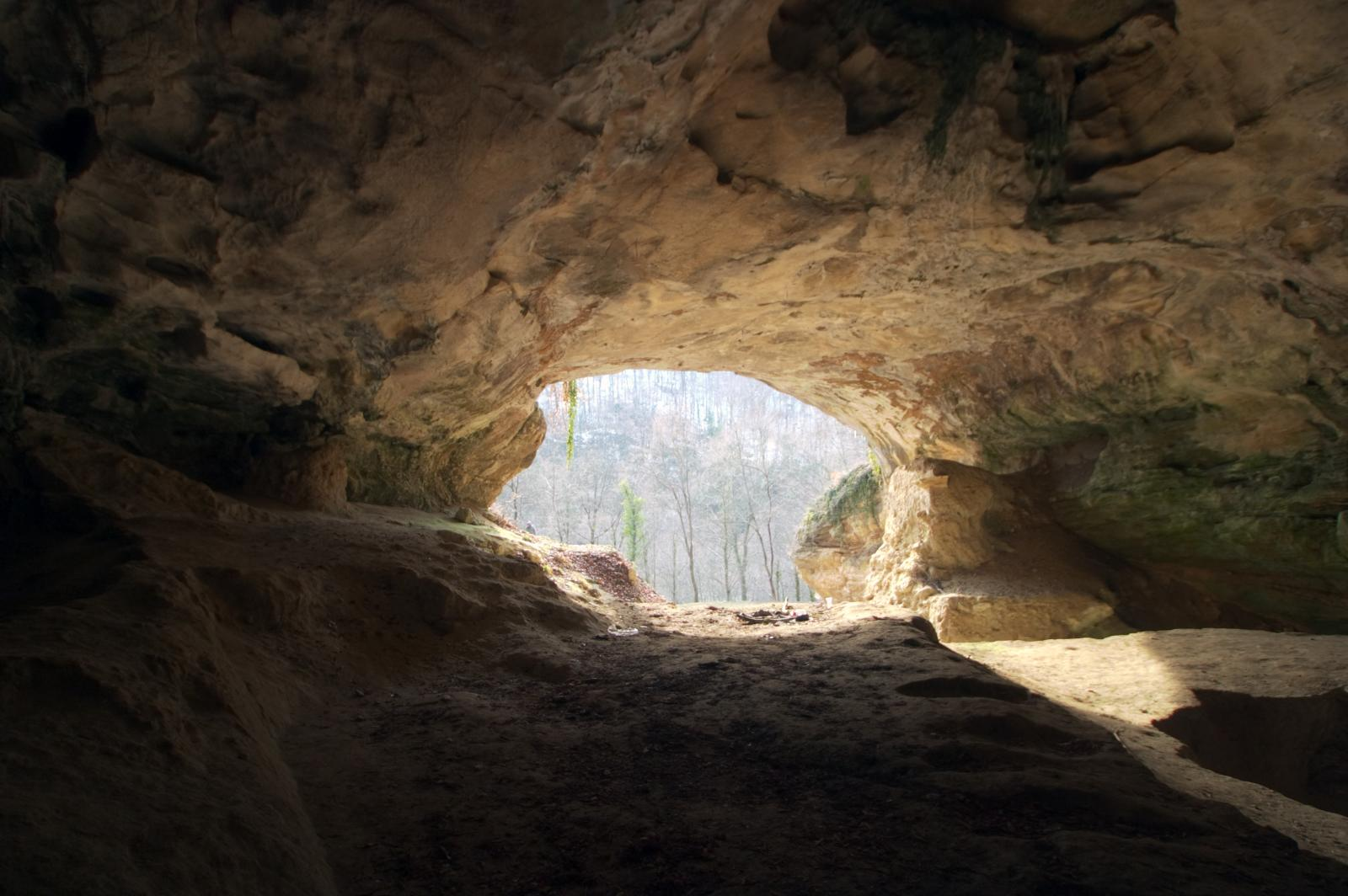
Vindija Cave, near Varaždin, is a major Neanderthal site.

=== Paleolithic ===
The earliest traces of human presence on Croatian soil date back to the Paleolithic Age. In Šandalja Cave near Pula, and in Punikve near Ivanec, flints made by pre-Neanderthal people have been found, while the remains of Neanderthal prehistoric humans have been discovered on Hušnjakovo near Krapina. In the Middle Paleolithic period, Neandertals lived in modern Zagorje, northern Croatia. Dragutin Gorjanović-Kramberger discovered bones and other remnants of a Neandertal, subsequently named Homo krapiniensis, on a hill near the town of Krapina, and a Palaeolithic site on Hušnjakovo near Krapina counted among the largest and richest sites in the world where Neanderthal remains have been found. During excavations from 1899 to 1905, led by the palaeontologist and geologist Dragutin Gorjanović-Kramberger, abundant remains of Palaeolithic items and the bones of extinct prehistoric animals were discovered. The Krapina finds are estimated to be 130,000 years old. Archaeological finds from the Palaeolithic Age have been discovered in other places throughout Croatia (Vindija Cave, Veternica, etc.). Vindija sediments are 12 m thick, divided in 13 layers designated from unit A (youngest) to unit M.

=== Neolithic ===
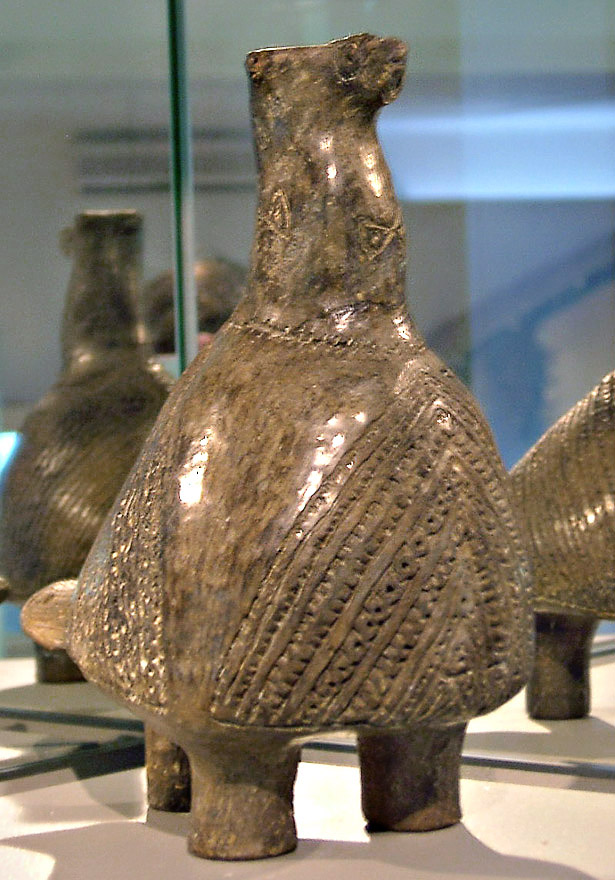
The Vučedol Dove, a ritual vessel made between 2800 and 2500 BC, is an emblem of the Vučedol culture.

The Neolithic period (c. 6000 BC – c. 3000 BC) was characterised by the emergence of permanent, organised settlements, and by the production of earthenware and other items. In the Adriatic area, the most significant Neolithic cultures are the Impresso, Danilo and Hvar cultures, and, in the interior, the Sopot and Korenovo cultures, while the major sites where finds have been recovered are Smilčić near Zadar, Danilo near Šibenik, Markova and Grapčeva Caves on Hvar, and others. In the early Neolithic period, the Starčevo, Vinča and Sopot cultures were scattered between and around the Sava, the Drava and the Danube. Notable are the excavation sites of Ščitarjevo near Zagreb, Sopot near Vinkovci, Vučedol near Vukovar, Nakovanj on Pelješac.

Smilčić, near Zadar, one of the richest Neolithic sites on open ground. The settlement was surrounded by a defence moat and the dwellings were huts built above ground from interwoven branches. It has been established that the settlement developed in two stages: the earlier stage, with finds from the Impresso culture, and the later stage, characterised by the Danilo culture. Among the finds, some ceramic, richly decorated cultic vessels with four feet (rhytons) stand out, as well as various vessels decorated with paintings and engravings.

=== Bronze Age ===
As the Stone Age moved into the Bronze Age, known as the Eneolithic or Chalcolithic period, in which the first metal – copper – began to be used, the Vučedol culture arose (c. 3000 BC – c. 2200 BC), named after the locality of Vučedol, on the bank of the Danube near Vukovar. Vučedol, near Vukovar, an important prehistoric site (‘The Troy of the Danube’), after which the Vučedol culture was named, and which embraced a wider cultural complex from the Carpathians to the eastern Alps and the Dinaric Alps. It is presumed to have emerged after the arrival of Indo-European settlers around 3,000 BC and lasted until about 2,000 BC. Its characteristics include new metalwork procedures, extremely skilled ceramics, and, according to some researchers, the people used a calendar marked on ceramic vessels.

In the Bronze Age (c. 2500 BC – c. 800 BC), a period of great ethnic strife and migration, metalwork and techniques for producing bronze items continued to develop. Several cultural groups can be singled out (the Gradina (hillfort)/Castellieri culture in Istria, the Urnfield culture in northern Croatia, the Cetina culture in Dalmatia, etc.), which arose through the symbiosis of earlier cultural traditions and the various influences of strong neighbouring cultures.

=== Iron Age ===
The Iron Age left traces of the Hallstatt culture (proto-Illyrians) and the La Tène culture (proto-Celts). The arrival of the systematic production and use of iron tools marked the beginning of the Iron Age (c. 800 BC – early 1st century), during which the first ethnic communities appeared in the area which is present-day Croatia. Their names were recorded by Greek and Roman writers. They belonged to the Illyrian Histri, Iapodes, Liburnians, Delmatae, Ardiaei, etc., and came under the strong influence of Greek and Italic culture, and from the 4th century BC, under the influence of Celtic spiritual and material culture.

Nesactium (Vizače), northeast of Pula, was a prominent centre for the Illyrian Histri in the first millennium BC. They continued to live there right up to late classical times, i.e. the early Christian era. In Nesactium, bronze pails decorated with figures, fragments of jewellery, weapons and ceramics have been found, along with examples of monumental stonework, representing the greatest achievements of prehistoric artistic creativity on Croatian soil. In the village of Prozor near Otočac, the remains of a settlement and necropolis belonging to the Illyrians Iapodes (first millennium BC) have been discovered. The people lived there during the Roman age. They had a high level of artistic craftwork, represented by bronze ornaments with specific shapes, such as ornaments for the head (circlets), pendants, links for belts, buckles, clasps, and so on, and their jewellery was distinct for its use of amber and glass paste.

== Illyria ==
In recorded history, the area was inhabited by Illyrian tribes such as the Delmetae, who spoke an Illyrian language, an ancient branch of Indo-European. Other tribes such as the Liburni and Iapodes, whose ethnicity is less clear, inhabited various parts of the Adriatic coastline and interior between modern Istria and Herzegovina.

In the 4th century BC the northern parts of modern-day Croatia were also colonized by the Celts, the Scordisci tribe. Other Celtic peoples may also have been found elsewhere integrated among the Illyrians. The islands of Issa and Pharos as well as the locality of Tragurion became Greek colonies since the same period.

Illyria was independent of foreign rule until the Romans conquered it two centuries later, in 168 BC. The Romans organized the land into the Roman province of Illyricum which encompassed most of modern Croatia). Illyricum was subsequently split into the provinces of Pannonia and Dalmatia in year 10. Pannonia was further split in two by Trajan between 102 and 107.

A fourfold split of the same province followed at the turn of the 4th century under Diocletian — an emperor of Illyrian descent, from Dalmatia. Other notable people from these areas in this period included the Christian Jerome, Saint Marinus (builder of San Marino), emperors Valentinian I and Valens, and Pope John IV.

After the fall of the Western Roman Empire in the 5th century, the Roman roads and the Illyrian population speaking Romance languages (such as Istro-Romanian or Dalmatian) remained. With the increasing amount of human migration, this population entrenched in the cities along the whole Dalmatian coast.

The Lombards and the Huns made an incursion from the north. After 476 the area was subject to Odoacer and then to Ostrogoth rulers beginning with Theodoric the Great. Justinian claimed the old province of Dalmatia to the Eastern Roman Empire in 535. Forebears of Croatia's current Slav population settled there in the 7th century following the Avars, reportedly under instructions from Byzantine emperor Heraclius.

== See also ==
- Origin hypotheses of the Croats
