= Mirko Malez =

Croatian palaeontologist (1924–1990)

Dr. Mirko Malez in 1976.

Mirko Malez (November 5, 1924 – August 23, 1990) was a prominent Croatian palaeontologist, speleologist, geo-scientist, ecologist and natural history writer. He was known as a "pioneer of Croatian speleoarchaeology". He was a member of the Yugoslav Academy, JAZU (present-day Croatian, HAZU - Croatian Academy of Sciences and Arts and one of only four Croatian PhDs of speleology (Josip Poljak 1922, Mirko Malez 1963, Srećko Božičević 1985, and Mladen Garašić 1986). Thanks to Malez's popularization of science, Varaždin County, in northern Croatia, is also known as a "cradle of the Palaeolithic age".

In his honor four new species were named: Dalmatichthys malezi (Radovčić 1975), Ilyocypris malezi (Sokač 1978), Mimomys malezi (Rabeder 1983) and Vaccinites malezi (Slišković 1991). Most of his papers and research interests were directed towards fossil mammals of the Pleistocene and the paleontological processing of certain species, determining their taxonomy, migrations and palaeogeography.

== Early life ==
Malez was born to a large family in the small town of Ivanec, in northwestern Croatia on 5 November 1924, at his family home. He was the first of six children of a local barber and amateur photographer Slavko Malez, and Matilda Malez (née Polak). He finished elementary school in 1939. In the summer of 1935, a local naturalist and archaeologist Stjepan Vuković organized an exhibition of prehistorical finds from Vindija Cave and Sever's quarry near Vuglovac, and this event in Malez's early childhood certainly affected his future career.

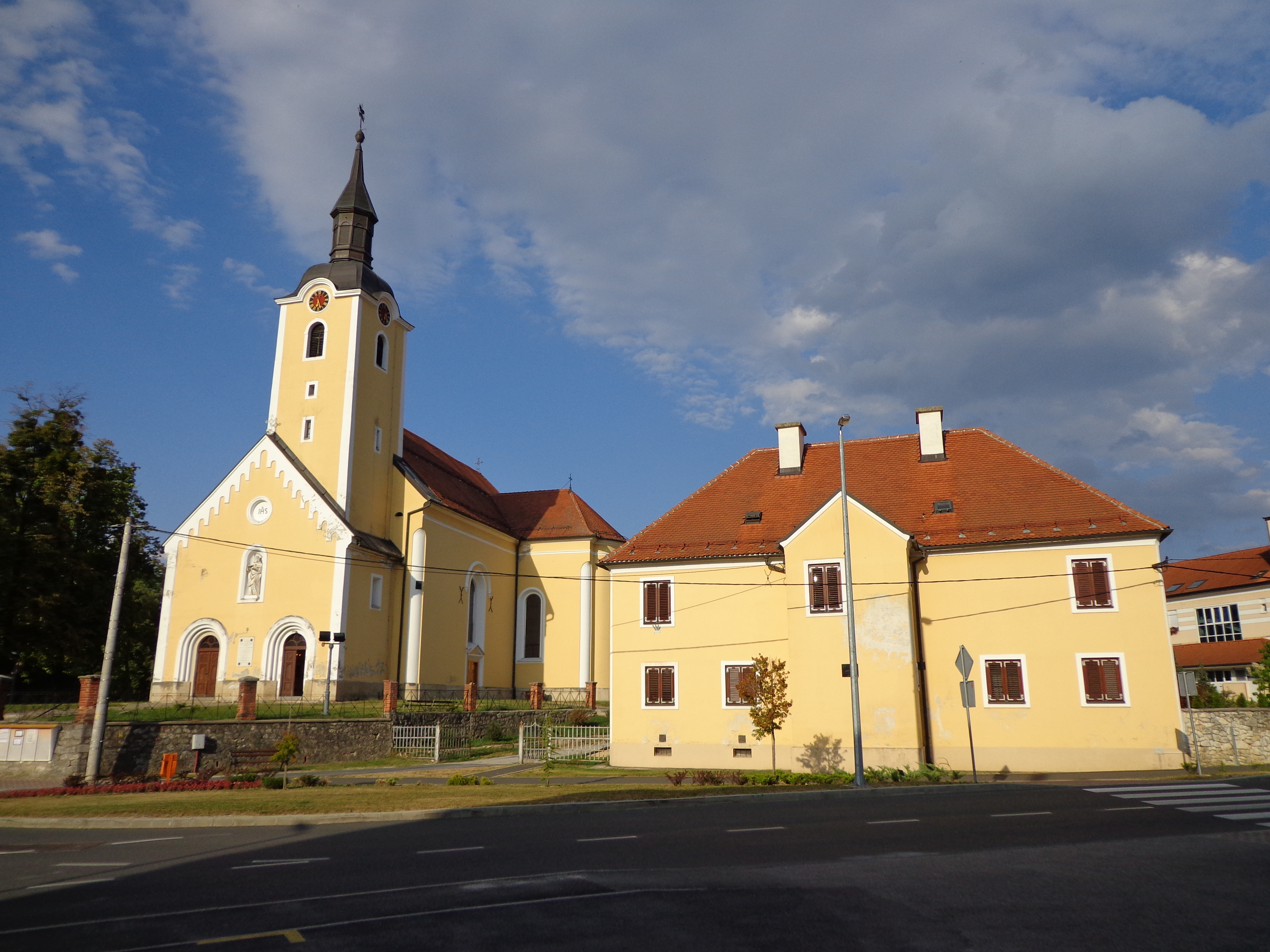
Church of St. Marija Magdalena in Ivanec, Croatia

Malez did not immediately enrol in the local gymnasium, probably due to his family's financial circumstances. The nearness of the Ivanec lignite mine enabled him to take an electrician's apprenticeship instead. His ambitions were greater, but World War II interrupted his education. During the war, he worked as an assistant electrician and machinist at the Ivanec lignite mine. In 1945, he was deported by Yugoslav Partisans to captivity in Serbia, because he was associated with the Croatian Home Guard (Croatian: Hrvatsko domobranstvo, often abbreviated to Domobrani). Soon after, he was separated from the group to join a team repairing the local power plant.

After returning home, Malez decided to continue his education. He graduated from the local gymnasium in 1948.

Stjepan Vuković, as early as 1928, showed an interest in Vindija Cave near Ivanec, and from 1934 until 1969 uncovered archaeological finds in its Holocene layers. As a keen nature lover, Malez deferred to Vuković, to be able to wander the local hills, caves, mountains and prehistoric sites - Ivanščica, Ravna Gora, and Vindija Cave. Soon after this, Malez published his first articles in the journals Srednjoškolac and Varaždinske vijesti.

Being impressed by the fossil finds, Malez decided to study geology and Paleontology. During his studies, he performed as a demonstrator and an assistant in organizing geological team expeditions, led by Marijan Salopek from the Geological-paleontological Institute of the Faculty. Malez received a B.A. in 1953. and a PhD in 1963, both in geology and palaeontology, from the Faculty of Science, Dept. of Geology, University of Zagreb. He published his first fieldwork reports in 1953. In 1963, his dissertation was on the theme " Stratigraphic and paleontological research of diluvial (Diluvium) sites inside the Veternica cave (Medvednica, near Zagreb).

Malez has a daughter Vesna Malez, born in 1949, who is a recognized Croatian scientist of paleornithology at HAZU, currently employed at the Institute for Quaternary Paleontology and Geology, since Jan 1, 2011.

== Speleological work ==
Dr. Mirko Malez explains the morphology of the stalagmite sample (source: 1975. RTZ series Tajne Jadrana, episode 'Tajna Medvjeđe Pećine')

Since his first research in 1946, Malez has been recognized as a very active and productive speleologist. As a geologist, he worked on various specialised researches into geomorphology, genesis, hydrology, tectonics, palaeontology, archaeology, microclimate, biospeleology and so on. He regularly compiled photographic documentation, which now forms an important professional and historical record. His speleological research covered the now independent states of Bosnia Herzegovina, Croatia, Macedonia, Montenegro, Serbia and Slovenia, where he researched about 1000 caves, for the most part in Croatia. Malez published his speleological research regularly, from 1952 until 1974, in the academic publication Ljetopis JAZU.

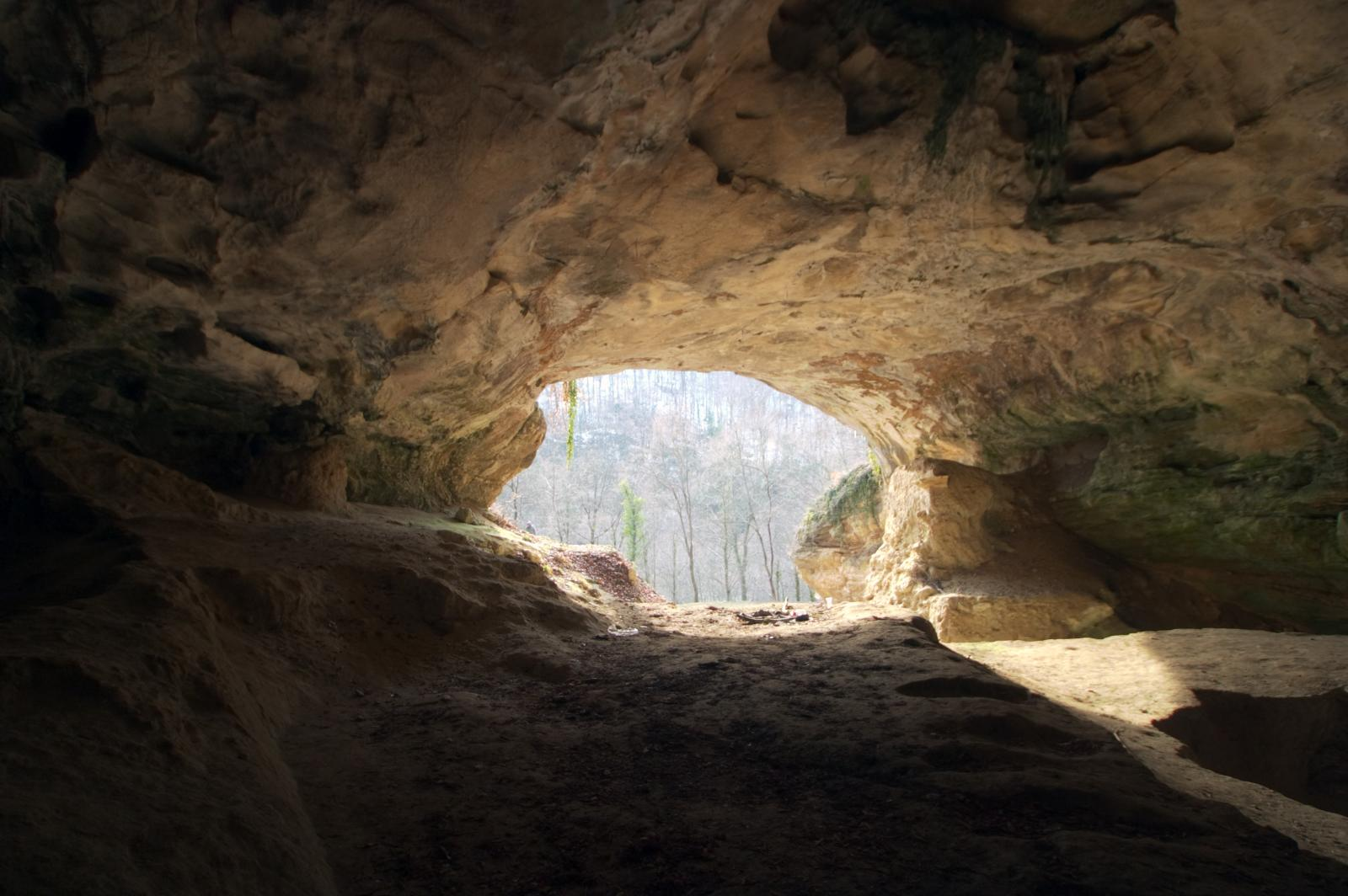
Vindija Cave, in Varaždin County, Croatia

Some notable monographs described the caves of Mount Učka and Mount Ćićarija in Istria, the caves in SW Lika, together with 277 other documented caves, for example, monographs on the Veternica cave near Zagreb and the Cerovac špilje caves near Gračac.

In 1953, he was one of the founders of the magazine Speleolog, the first speleo magazine in Croatia and the former Yugoslavia. He was one of organisers of the Second Speleo Congress in Split in 1958, and also the chief organiser of the Ninth Yugoslavian Speleo Congress, in Karlovac in 1984, for which he was Chief Editor of Proceedings, comprising almost 900 pages. HAZU, an extensive and systematic speleological agency, included Malez among the most prominent speleologists in Croatia. (ed. Roman Ozimec, Hrvoje Cvitanović: Papers on the Institute for scientific research work in Varaždin, Issue 22, 15 HAZU, 2011. 105-106).

== Professional career ==
On June 6, 1953, Malez began his professional career as an assistant in the professional class of Academician Marijan Salopek in the Geological-Paleontological Collection and Karst Laboratory of the JAZU (Yugoslav Academy of Art and Science) (The Collection & Laboratory unit was officially active since March 24, 1955) Its purpose was geological–paleontological, hydrological and speleological research of the karst, and archive development. When it redirected its research to palaeontology of the vertebrates, and quaternary geology, the academy on July 25, 1953, renamed the 'Paleontological Collection Unit' to the 'Institute for Quaternary Palaeontology and Geology', with Malez as its first director. In 1978, the academy established a research center and its first director was also Malez. He stayed in this position until his retirement in March 1990. He began his associate JAZU (HAZU) membership in 1968, and a full membership in 1979. Malez was credited with the development of the Collection and Library of the Institute for Quaternary Palaeontology and Geology.

In 1989, he was chosen to receive associate membership of the Austrian Academy of Sciences. He worked with many foreign scientists and experts, especially Austrian and Soviet. Malez cooperated with several others on making the geological map of Yugoslavia, and on the pedological map: he cooperated with Dr Teofil Slišković in interpreting the vertebrate fossil finds and the quaternary geology of the Bosnia Herzegovina, then with Ivan Rakovec (doyen of Slovenian quaternary research), Dr Risto Garevski, during the analyses of the tertiary vertebrate faunas of Macedonia, Erich Thenius and Helmuth Zapfe in Vienna, Herbert Ullrich from Berlin, Henry de Lumley from Paris, Fred Smith from the US and Ann Forsten from Helsinki.

Following his research inclinations and scientific obligations over the years, he visited Lebanon, Egypt, Tunisia, Morocco, Kenya, Tanzania, Zambia, China and Mexico.

World-famous media such as National Geographic and the BBC showed an interest on Malez's research.

As well as performing scientific research, Malez served as Editor in Chief for all issues of the whilom journal Razred za prirodne znanosti Akademije and sat on a number of other magazine editorial advisory, and inter-academic, boards. From the early 1950s he started publishing scientific – popular articles about speleology and geology in the magazines Naše Planine and Speleolog. Malez published over 200 papers, and 14 speleological studies and analyses, on speleology that covered cave genesis, and underground and surface karst phenomena.

Malez was also an associate professor at the Faculty of Science (Prirodoslovno-matematički Fakultet) at the University of Zagreb. He was the founder and president of the Speleological Association of Croatia.

During an expedition to the "Strašna peć" cave in 1953 (English: "the horrible stove"), Malez wrote: "We were muddy, dirty, bloody as well, since we scraped on the stone blocks and stalactites during the wriggling and crawling. But, we didn't feel any regret. We were inebriated with the beauty we saw inside that place. We have experienced the harmony of the natural creation and have realised that it is indeed "horrible", as its name is telling us..".

For his scientific contributions in 1966 he received the "Ruđer Bošković" award. Malez left over 430 original scientific, expert and popular-scientific papers on quaternary geology, tertiary and quaternary vertebrates, fossil man and his material cultures, and papers about Palaeolithic and Mesolithic archaeology and speleology. Some of his main research sites included Vindija, Istrian sites Šandalja, Oporovina, the Romualdova cave, Pećina on the Gradina hills, the Vergotinova cave, Klanjčeva peć, Podosojna peć, Loza and the well-known Veternica cave, on the south-facing hill slopes northwest of the Croatian capital Zagreb. In Romualdova cave between 1961 and 1962, Malez excavated five probes in the cave and found the bones of Pleistocene animals, including the cave bear, cave lion, leopard, cave hyena, wild horse, big deer, snow hare, and others.

Malez carried out anatomical-morphological analyses and studies of geological stratigraphy dating, the appearance of ice wedges and the development of river terraces. He paid special attention to the levels of the Gravettian culture in the Šandalja cave near the city of Pula in Croatia. On the evidence of hearthstones and material cultures, Malez found the presence of the early man Homo Erectus in the Šandalja cave dated to approximately 900,000 years of age.

The Vindija Cave site was first excavated in the first half of the 20th century, and more extensively excavated between 1974 and 1986 by Malez. Numerous archaeological and faunal remains have been found, with over 100 hominid discoveries.

Co-authoring with Erich Thenius Malez describes a new species, from the Perissodactyla Order, Amynodontidae Family: Cadurcotherium rakoveci, whose fragments were found in Ugljevik, Bosnia-Herzegovina within brown coal, dated to the Upper Oligocene (or lower Miocene). This species is the most evolved of the part of the Order that migrated to Europe from Asia in the beginning of the Oligocene.

Producer Branko Knezoci and Dr. Mirko Malez onboard Tornado Croatian research ship (source: 1975. RTZ series Tajne Jadrana, episode 'Tajna Medvjeđe Pećine')

During deep-sea trawling by driftnet in 1979, in the aquatorium between the islands of Rab, Laganj and Pag, his team recovered a molar and a diaphysis of the femur of a fossil elephant.

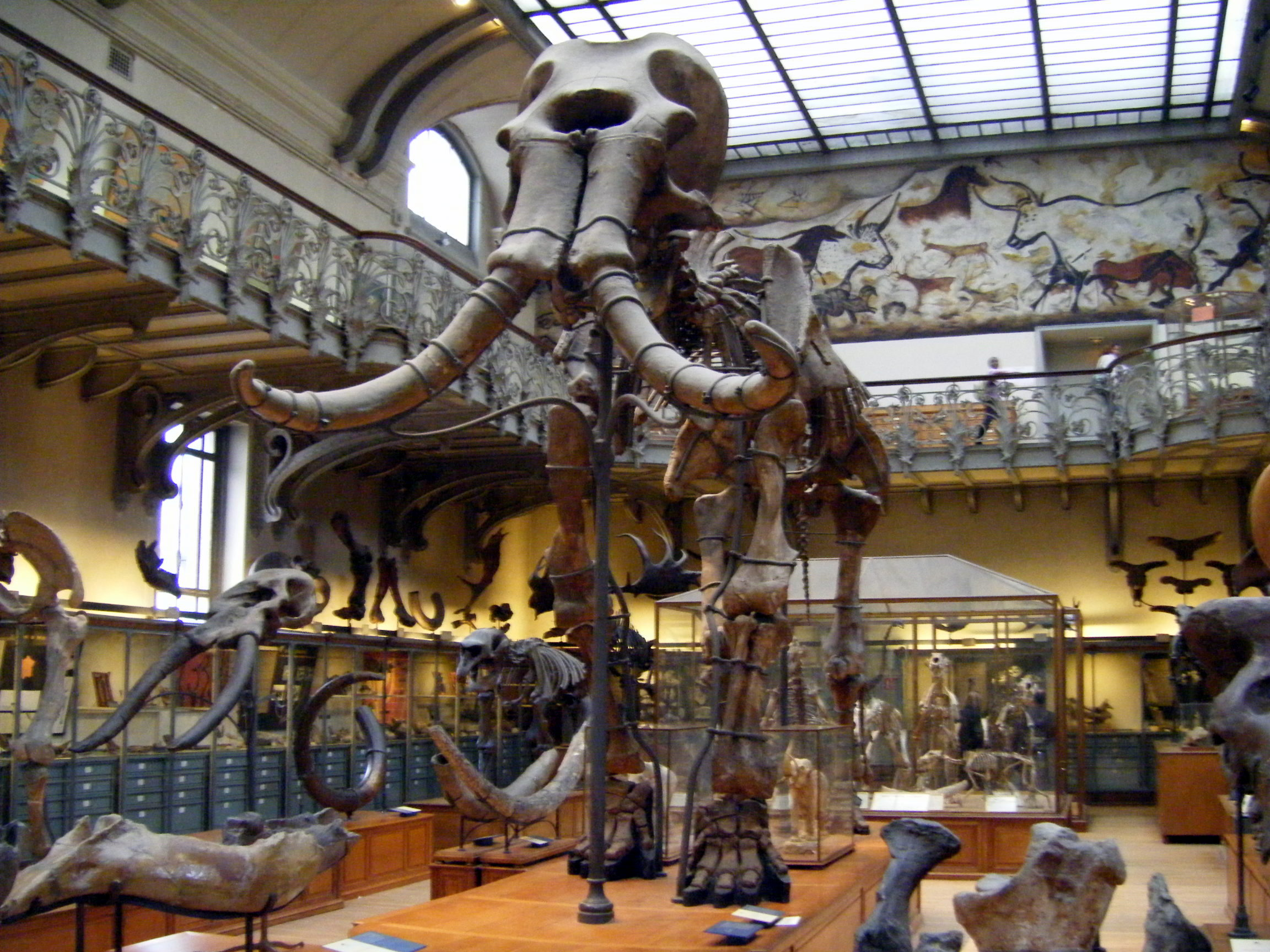
Skeleton of Mammuthus meridionalis, Muséum national d'Histoire naturelle, Paris

Malez, in cooperation with Gernot Rabeder, studied the fauna of mammals from bone breccias, from the Podumci 1 site, dated mostly to lower Pleistocene. The data from that study, and a stratigraphic analysis of the fauna, enabled the authors to reconstruct the evolutionary lines of the families Episoriculus, Microtus, Pliomys, Lagurus and Dinaromys. Three new species were determined: Episoriculus thenii, Reteliomys podumcensis, Microtus thenii and a subspecies Lagurus arankae podumcensis.

Malez participated in the editorial team publishing the monograph project "The Prehistory of the Yugoslav Countries". Further, in a few articles he analysed pathological transformations on the bones of cave bear remains, in cooperation with Nikolić and the Institute for Anatomy of the faculty for Medicine at the University of Zagreb.

A controversy related to Malez emerged in 1990, when he wrote in an article "80 years of organised speleological research in Croatia", that organised speleological research in Croatia begins with establishing the "Committee for cave research" within the Geological Commission of the Kingdom of Croatia and Slavonia in 1910. In Malez's article there was no mention of the "hiking sections", other departments, or the famous KSPSH (Commission for Speleology, Mountain Association of Croatia). It was quite controversial for Malez to mention only the state institutions and some companies related to speleological activities. However, Malez's omission was probably a reflection of the confusing social and political situation at that time in Croatia, and among its academic population.

He was an honorary member of the Speleological society of Croatia, the Croatian Geological Survey, the Croatian Natural History Society, the Croatian Anthropological Society and the Croatian Geographic Society. As an active member he participated in the work of the Deutsche Quartarvereinigung, Hugo Obermeier Gesellschaft, the Paleontological Association and others.

Malez was a great admirer of nature, and a persistent supporter of nature conservation and protection initiatives.

== A pioneer of Croatian speleoarchaeology ==
Prominent Croatian archaeologists were part of Malez's team of explorers, particularly in Lika. As a result of his stratigraphic, palaeontological, palaeoanthropological, palaeoclimatic, and archaeological documentation, there is greater understanding of culture from the Old Stone Age to the Middle Ages. Changes in the ecosystem (flora, fauna), the types of climatic periods, and the first groups of fossil people, i.e. their material culture, raw materials, daily activities (hunting, gathering, lithic artefact manufacturing) and spiritual culture are better understood due to the research conducted by Academician Malez in the cave areas.

== "Krapina early man and hominid evolution" conferences ==
Dr Malez was an honorary chairman, in a series of meetings "Krapina early man and hominid evolution", held on May, 31st 1969, in Zagreb to honour the 70th anniversary of the discovery of the Krapina man, primarily by the eminent Croatian geologist and paleontologist Dragutin Gorjanović-Kramberger. Results were presented of recent studies of the rich paleontological, paleoanthropological and archaeological material gathered from Pleistocene layers in a shelter in the Hušnjakovo hill at Krapina. The event attracted attention and interest in the Krapina remains among many scientists: Erik Trinkaus, J. H. Musgrave, F. H. Smith, C. Guth, M. - A. de Lumley, Milford H. Wolpoff, A. Gardner and H. Ullrich.

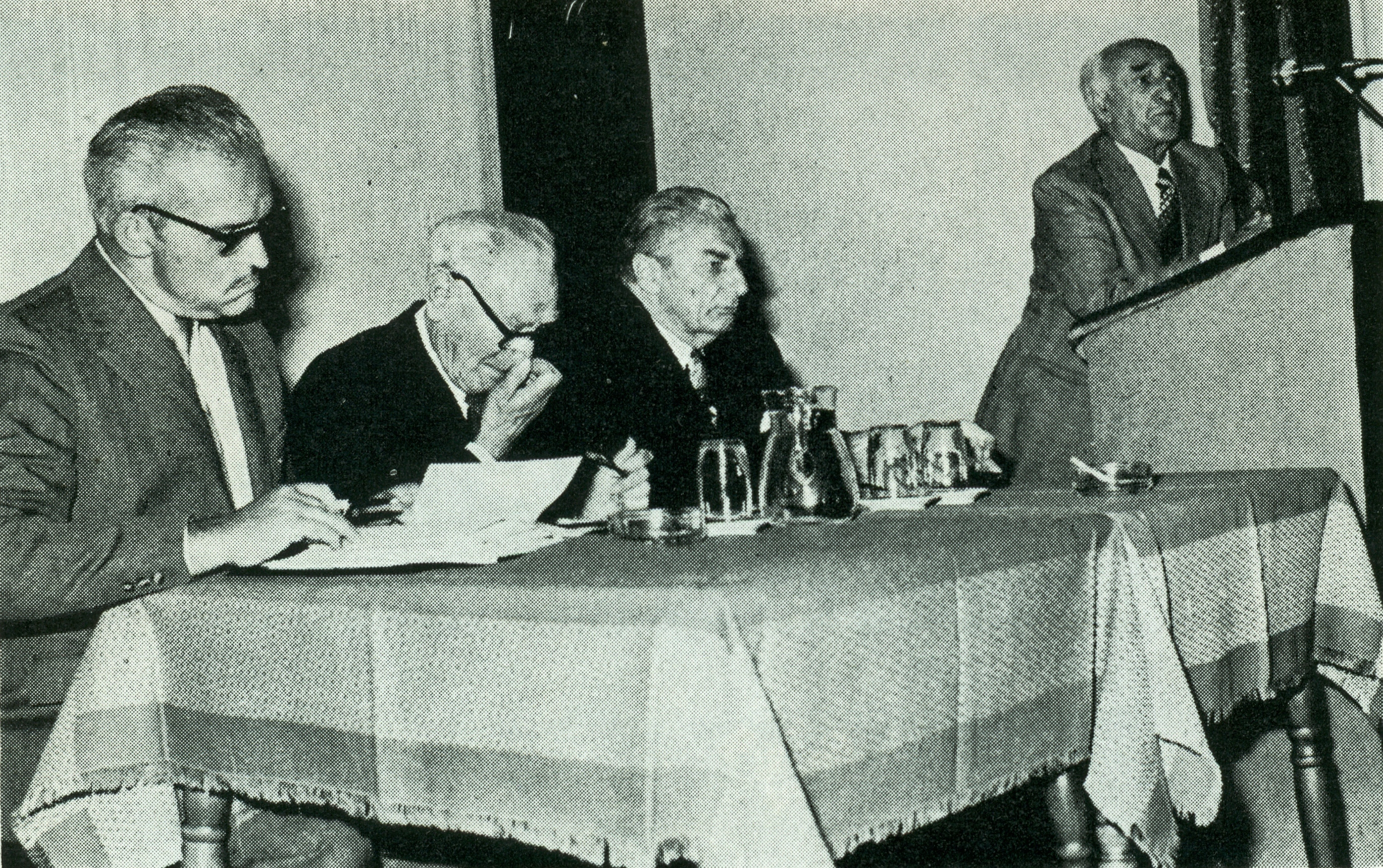
The presidential board of the International Conference "Krapina early man and hominid evolution", Krapina, Croatia, Sept. 17. 1976. From the left: Mirko Malez, S. Nežmahen and J. Kallay. At the lectern Lj. Barić.

The meetings on the Krapina Early Man and Hominid Evolution were organized by Yugoslav Academy of Sciences and Arts (JAZU).

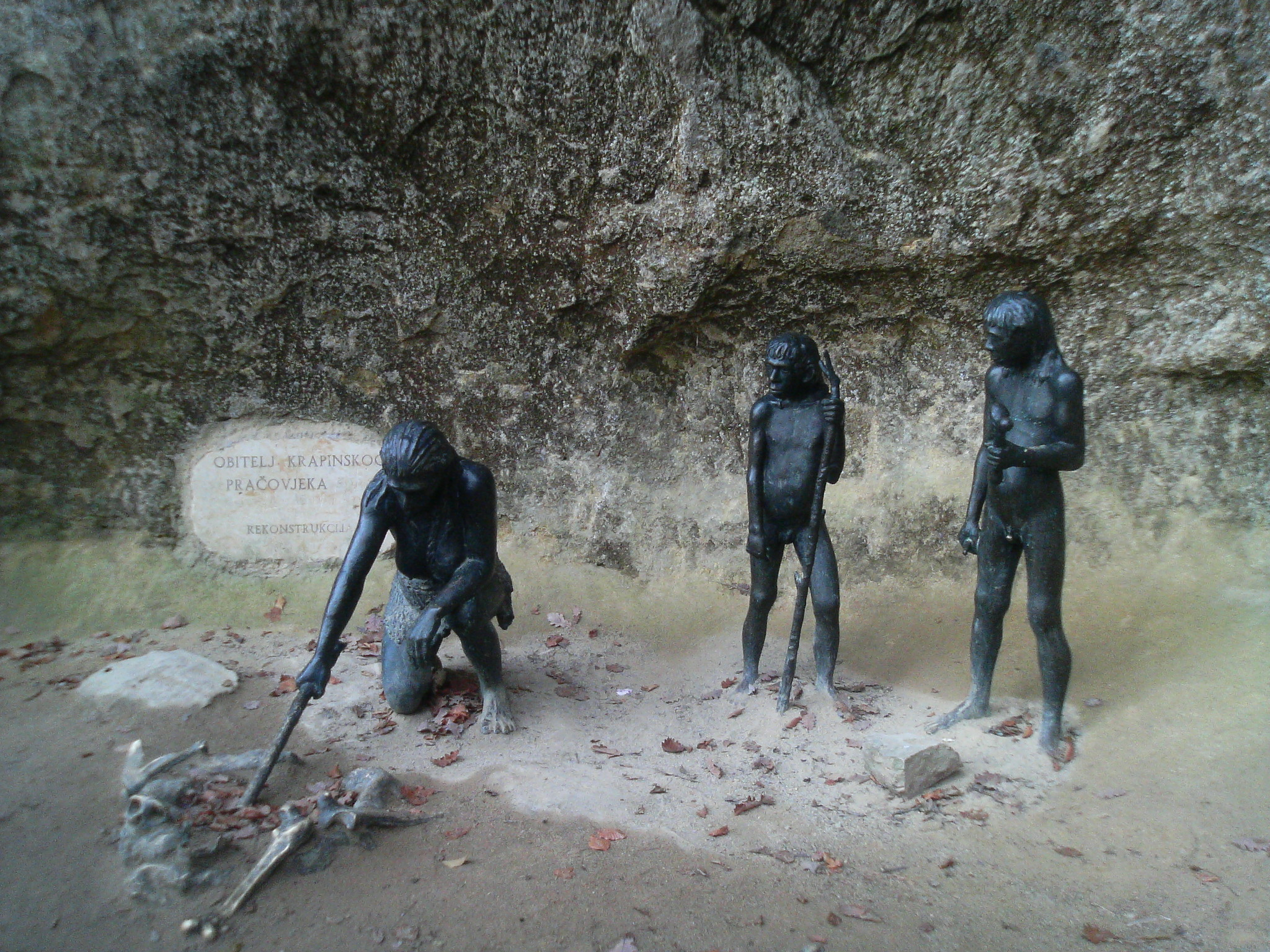
Nalazište pračovjeka Krapina, (eng. Hušnjakovo Neanderthal site near the Croatian town of Krapina

Research has continued, at the Krapina site and its wider vicinity, into earlier Quaternary geological, paleontological, archaeological, and paleo-climatic aspects. Subsequent meetings were organised, for example one held in Krapina on September 17, 1976 (also organized by JAZU).

Malez's last published paper was a biographical article dedicated to the Croatian-Argentinian paleontologist Luka Kraljević.

== Legacy and death ==
Malez died at the age of 65, on August 23, 1990, in Zagreb after a serious illness. His body was cremated and his ashes were buried in the urn cemetery at Zagreb's Mirogoj. HAZU organized a commemoration for Malez, held on December 5, 1991.

Since his death, many conferences, gatherings and tribute meetings have been organised, in Croatia and abroad, to honour the character and work of this famous Croatian scientist. A conference held on Nov. 20, 2010, in Ivanec, his hometown, honoured the 20th anniversary of his death. A group of 15 scientists recalled the significance of his scientific contributions to local geology, archaeology and paleontology.

On June 17, 2011, in his hometown Ivanec, new published Proceedings, were dedicated to Malez by Ivanec's mayor Milorad Batinić and HAZU Academicians Ivan Gušić and Slobodan Kaštela.

On March 25–26, 2011, a 2nd international scientific meeting was organised in Zagreb, in memory of Malez, by the National INQUA Committee (Croatian Academy of Sciences and Arts, Department for Natural Sciences, Institute of Quaternary Paleontology and Geology). The meeting celebrated the 55th anniversary of the Institute of Quaternary Paleontology and Geology. The honorary chairmanship board included Ljerka Marjanac, Lidija Galović, Nada Horvatinčić, Mladen Juračić, Ivor Karavanić and Josipa Velić.

To honor Malez, Ivanec's municipal authority decided to rename its central street after him. In the little town of Lepoglava near Varaždin, in September 2005, a small group was established called the Friends Club of the minerals "Mirko Malez".

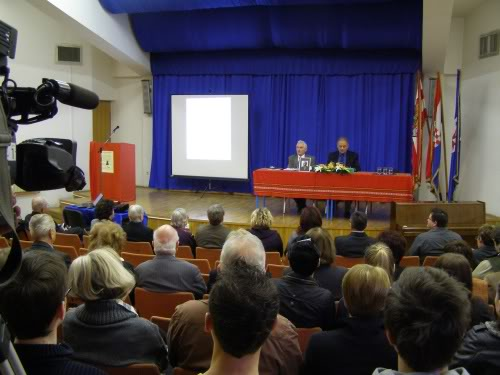
At the conference dedicated to Dr. Mirko Malez held on November 20, 2010, in Ivanec, Croatia. The honorary chairmanship members were Eduard Vargović (director of the Institute for the Scientific Labor HAZU in Varaždin and Željko Tomičić, an associate member of the HAZU.

== Selected publications ==
Malez published some of his research in these journal articles:

- M. Malez, 1956, Erster Fund des oberdiluvialen Menchen im dinarischen Karst, Bull. scientifique 3, 2 (Zagreb)
- M. Malez, 1960a, Paleontološka i speleološka istraživanja u 1960. godini, Ljetopis JAZU 67.
- M. Malez, 1960b, Entdeckung des ersten palaolithischen Fundortes in Dalmatien, Bull. scientifique 5, 4
- M. Malez, 1962, Romualdo Cave, a new significant pleistocene site in Istria, Bull. scientifique 7, 6
- M. Malez, 1964, Šandalja bei Pula - ein neuer und wichtiger palaolithischer Fundort in Istrien, Bull. scientifique 9, 6
- M. Malez, 1965a, Cerovačke pećine, Zagreb
- M. Malez, 1965b, Nalazišta fosilnih hominida u Hrvatskoj, Geološki vjesnik 18/2, Zagreb
- M. Malez, 1967a, Paleolitska nalazišta Hrvatske, Arheološki vestnik XVIII (Ljubljana)
- M. Malez, 1967b, Gornjopleistocenska fauna Crvene stijene, GZM NS XXI/XXII
- M. Malez, 1968, Tragovi paleolita u Romualdovoj pećini kod Rovinja u Istri, Acta et diss VI
- M. Malez, 1969, Šandalja bei Pula - eine bedeutende Ansiedlung der jungpalaolithischer Jager in Istrien, U. Internat. Kongress fur Speleologie, Stuttgart
- M. Malez & J. C. Vogel, 1969, Rezultati određivanja apsolutne starosti pleistocenskih naslaga Šandalje II kod Pule u Istri, Geološki vjesnik 22
- M. Malez, 1970, Krapina 1899 - 1969, JAZU Zagreb
- M. Malez, 1970, Adriatica Praehistorica et Antiqua, Zagreb: Das Palaolithikum im Gebiete der Ostkunste der Adria (1-16)
- M. Malez, 1970, Novi pogledi na stratigrafiju krapinskog nalazišta: Krapina 1899-1969, p. 13-44, JAZU Zagreb
- M. Malez, 1970, Rezultati revizije pleistocenske faune iz Krapine: Krapina 1899-1969, JAZU Zagreb
- M. Malez, 1970, Paleolitska kultura Krapine u svjetlu novijih istraživanja: Krapina 1899-1969, JAZU Zagreb
- M. Malez, 1975, Die Hohle Vindija - eine neue Fundstelle fossiler Hominiden in Kroatien. Bulletin scientifique Conseil des Academies des Sciences et des Arts de la RSF de Yugoslavie 20/5-6, p. 139-141.
- M. Malez & D. Rukavina, 1975, Krioturbacijske pojave u gornjopleistocenskim naslagama pećine Vindije u sjeverozapadnoj Hrvatskoj. Rad JAZU 371(17), pp. 245–265
- M. Malez, 1978a, Stratigrafski, paleofaunski i paleolitski odnosi krapinskog nalazišta: Krapinski pračovjek i evolucija hominida, p. 61-91, JAZU Zagreb
- M. Malez, 1978b, Novija istraživanja paleolitika u Hrvatskom zagorju: Arheološka istraživanja u sjeverozapadnoj Hrvatskoj (ed. Ž. Rapanić), p. 6-69, Croatian Archaeological Society 2, Zagreb
- M. Malez, 1979a, Rad na istraživanju paleolitskog i mezolitskog doba u Hrvatskoj: Praistorija jugoslavenskih zemalja, vol. I (ed. A. Benac), pp. 221–226, Sarajevo
- M. Malez, 1979b, Nalazišta paleolitskog i mezolitskog doba u Hrvatskoj: Praistorija jugoslavenskih zemalja, vol. I (ed. A. Benac), pp. 227–276, Sarajevo
- M. Malez, 1980, Kvartar-geološka istraživanja spilje Vindije u 1980. godini: Vijesti JAZU 2, 16-18
- M. Malez, 1981, Paleolitik na području Zagreba: Arheološka istraživanja u Zagrebu i njegovoj okolici (ed. Ž. Rapanić), pp. 65–108, Croatian Archaeological Society 6, Zagreb
- M. Malez, 1983, Prilog poznavanju kulta spiljskog medvjeda u paleolitiku Hrvatske: Zbornik za narodni život i običaje Južnih Slavena 49, pp. 333–347.
- M. Malez, 1985a, Spilja Vindija kao kultno mjesto neandertalca. Godišnjak Gradskog muzeja u Varaždinu 7, pp. 31–47
- M. Malez, 1985b, On the possibility of the Existence of a skull cult in Neanderthals from the Vindija cave (Croatia, Yugoslavia). Collegium Anthropologicum 9(2), pp. 231–240
- M. Malez, 1986, Pregled paleolitičkih i mezolitičkih kultura na području Istre; Izdanja Hrvatskog arheološkog društva, br. 11, pp. 3–47
- M. Malez, 1987, Izdanja Hrvatskog arheološkog društva, 11, Pula
