= Neanderthal genome project =

Effort to sequence the Neanderthal genome

The Neanderthal genome project is an effort, founded in July 2006, of a group of scientists to sequence the Neanderthal genome.

It was initiated by 454 Life Sciences, a biotechnology company based in Branford, Connecticut in the United States and is coordinated by the Max Planck Institute for Evolutionary Anthropology in Germany. In May 2010 the project published their initial draft of the Neanderthal genome (Vi33.16, Vi33.25, Vi33.26) based on the analysis of four billion base pairs of Neanderthal DNA. The study determined that some mixture of genes occurred between Neanderthals and anatomically modern humans and presented evidence that elements of their genome remain in modern humans outside Africa.

In December 2013, a high coverage genome of a Neanderthal was reported for the first time. DNA was extracted from a toe fragment from a female Neanderthal researchers have dubbed the "Altai Neandertal". It was found in Denisova Cave in the Altai Mountains of Siberia and is estimated to be 50,000 years old.

== Findings ==
The researchers recovered ancient DNA of Neanderthals by extracting the DNA from the femur bones of three 38,000 year-old female Neanderthal specimens from Vindija Cave, Croatia, and other bones found in Spain, Russia, and Germany. Only about half a gram of the bone samples (or 21 samples each 50–100 mg) was required for the sequencing, but the project faced many difficulties, including the contamination of the samples by the bacteria that had colonized the Neanderthal's body and humans who handled the bones at the excavation site and at the laboratory.

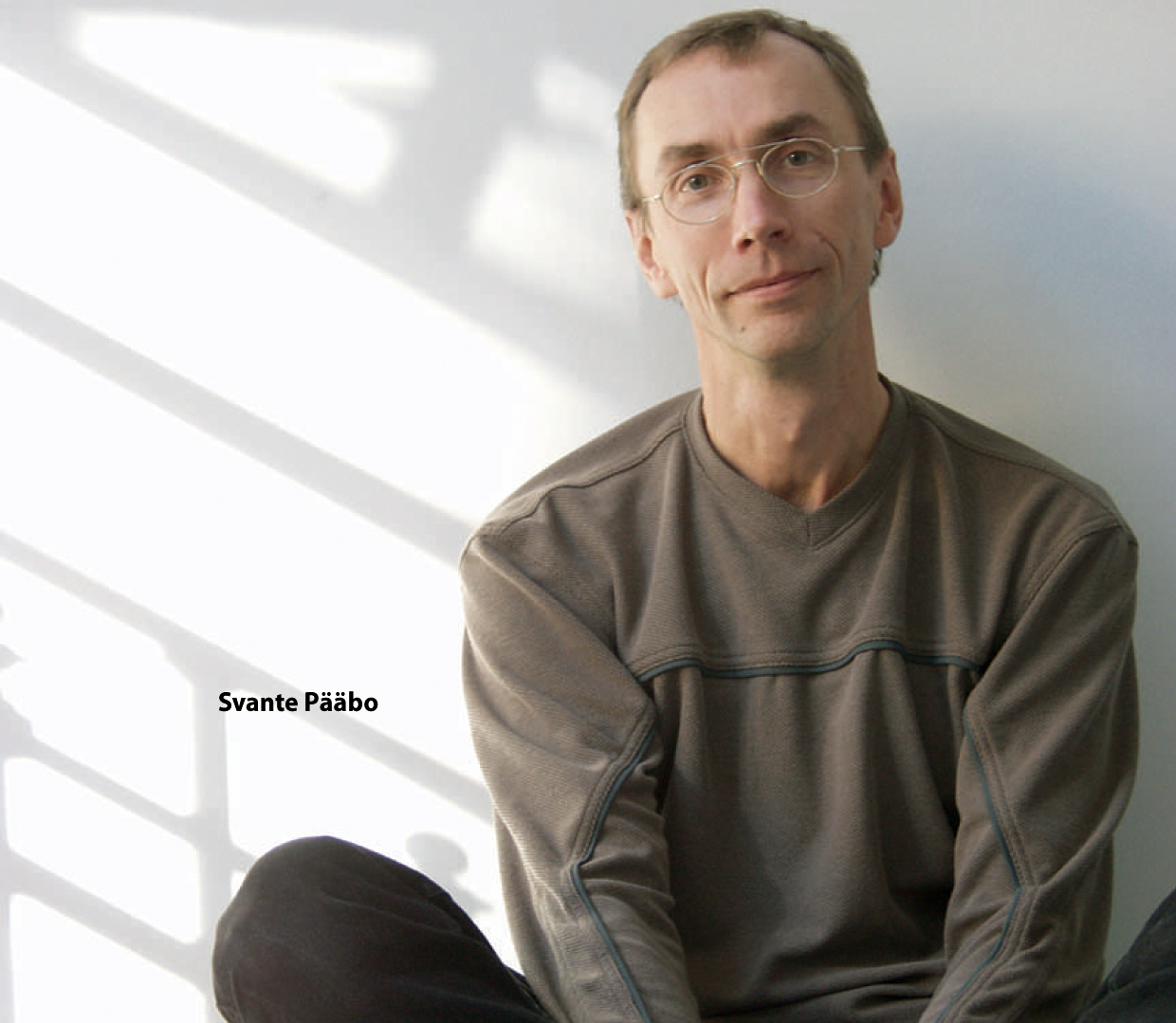
Svante Pääbo, director of the Department of Genetics at the Max Planck Institute for Evolutionary Anthropology and head of its Neanderthal genome project

In February 2009, the Max Planck Institute's team led by Svante Pääbo announced that they had completed the first draft of the Neanderthal genome. An early analysis of the data suggested in "the genome of Neanderthals, a human species driven to extinction" "no significant trace of Neanderthal genes in modern humans". New results suggested that some adult Neanderthals were lactose intolerant. On the question of potentially cloning a Neanderthal, Pääbo commented, "Starting from the DNA extracted from a fossil, it is and will remain impossible."

In May 2010, the project released a draft of their report on the sequenced Neanderthal genome. Contradicting the results discovered while examining mitochondrial DNA (mtDNA), they demonstrated a range of genetic contribution to non-African modern humans ranging from 1% to 4%. From their Homo sapiens samples in Eurasia (French, Han Chinese and Papuan) the authors stated that it is likely that interbreeding occurred in the Levant before Homo sapiens migrated into Europe. This finding is disputed because of the paucity of archeological evidence supporting their statement. The fossil evidence does not conclusively place Neanderthals and modern humans in close proximity at this time and place. According to preliminary sequences from 2010, 99.7% of the nucleotide sequences of the modern human and Neanderthal genomes are identical, compared to humans sharing around 98.8% of sequences with the chimpanzee. (For some time, studies concerning the commonality between chimps and humans modified the commonality of 99% to a commonality of only 94%, showing that the genetic gap between humans and chimpanzees was far larger than originally thought, but more recent knowledge states the difference between humans, chimpanzees, and bonobos at just about 1.0–1.2% again.)

Additionally, in 2010, the discovery and analysis of mtDNA from the Denisova hominin in Siberia revealed that it differed from that of modern humans by 385 bases (nucleotides) in the mtDNA strand out of approximately 16,500, whereas the difference between modern humans and Neanderthals is around 202 bases. In contrast, the difference between chimpanzees and modern humans is approximately 1,462 mtDNA base pairs. Analysis of the specimen's nuclear DNA was then still under way and expected to clarify whether the find is a distinct species. Even though the Denisova hominin's mtDNA lineage predates the divergence of modern humans and Neanderthals, coalescent theory does not preclude a more recent divergence date for her nuclear DNA.

A rib fragment from the partial skeleton of a Neanderthal infant found in the Mezmaiskaya cave in the northwestern foothills of the Caucasus Mountains was radiocarbon-dated in 1999 to 29,195±965 B.P., and therefore belonging to the latest lived Neanderthals. Ancient DNA recovered for a mtDNA sequence showed 3.48% divergence from that of the Feldhofer Neanderthal, some 2,500 km to the west in Germany and in 2011 Phylogenetic analysis placed the two in a clade distinct from modern humans, suggesting that their mtDNA types have not contributed to the modern human mtDNA pool.

In 2015, Israel Hershkovitz of Tel Aviv University reported that a skull found in a cave in northern Israel, is "probably a woman, who lived and died in the region about 55,000 years ago, placing modern humans there and then for the first time ever", pointing to a potential time and location when modern humans first interbred with Neanderthals.

In 2016, the project found that Neanderthals bred with modern humans multiple times, and that Neanderthals interbred with Denisovans only once, as evidenced in the genome of modern-day Melanesians.

In 2006, two research teams working on the same Neanderthal sample published their results, Richard Green and his team in Nature, and James Noonan's team in Science. The results were received with some scepticism, mainly surrounding the issue of a possible admixture of Neanderthals into the modern human genome.

In 2006, Richard Green's team had used a then new sequencing technique developed by 454 Life Sciences that amplifies single molecules for characterization and obtained over a quarter of a million unique short sequences ("reads"). The technique delivers randomly located reads, so that sequences of interest – genes that differ between modern humans and Neanderthals – show up at random as well. However, this form of direct sequencing destroys the original sample so to obtain new reads more samples must be destructively sequenced.

Noonan's team, led by Edward Rubin, used a different technique, one in which the Neanderthal DNA is inserted into bacteria, which make multiple copies of a single fragment. They demonstrated that Neanderthal genomic sequences can be recovered using a metagenomic library-based approach. All of the DNA in the sample is "immortalized" into metagenomic libraries. A DNA fragment is selected, then propagated in microbes. The resulting Neanderthal DNA sequences can then be sequenced or specific sequences can be studied.

Overall, their results were remarkably similar. One group suggested there was a hint of mixing between human and Neanderthal genomes, while the other found none, but both teams recognized that the data set was not large enough to give a definitive answer.

The publication by Noonan, and his team revealed Neanderthal DNA sequences matching chimpanzee DNA, but not modern human DNA, at multiple locations, thus enabling the first accurate calculation of the date of the most recent common ancestor of H. sapiens and H. neanderthalensis. The research team estimates the most recent common ancestor of their H. neanderthalensis samples and their H. sapiens reference sequence lived 706,000 years ago (divergence time), estimating the separation of the human and Neanderthal ancestral populations to 370,000 years ago (split time).

Our analyses suggest that on average the Neanderthal genomic sequence we obtained and the reference human genome sequence share a most recent common ancestor ~706,000 years ago, and that the human and Neanderthal ancestral populations split ~370,000 years ago, before the emergence of anatomically modern humans.

— Noonan et al. (2006)

Based on the analysis of mitochondrial DNA, the split of the Neanderthal and H. sapiens lineages is estimated to date to between 760,000 and 550,000 years ago (95% CI).

Mutations of the speech-related gene FOXP2 identical to those in modern humans were discovered in Neanderthal DNA from the El Sidrón 1253 and 1351c specimens, suggesting Neanderthals might have shared some basic language capabilities with modern humans.

== See also ==
- Cro-Magnon – Earliest anatomically modern humans in Europe and West Asia
- Neanderthal extinction
- Interbreeding between archaic and modern humans – Human hybridization during the Paleolithic

General:

- Admixture mapping – Interbreeding between isolated populations
- Gene flow – Transfer of genetic variation from one population to another
- Hybrid – Offspring of cross-species reproduction
