= Vindija Cave =

Cave and archaeological site in Croatia

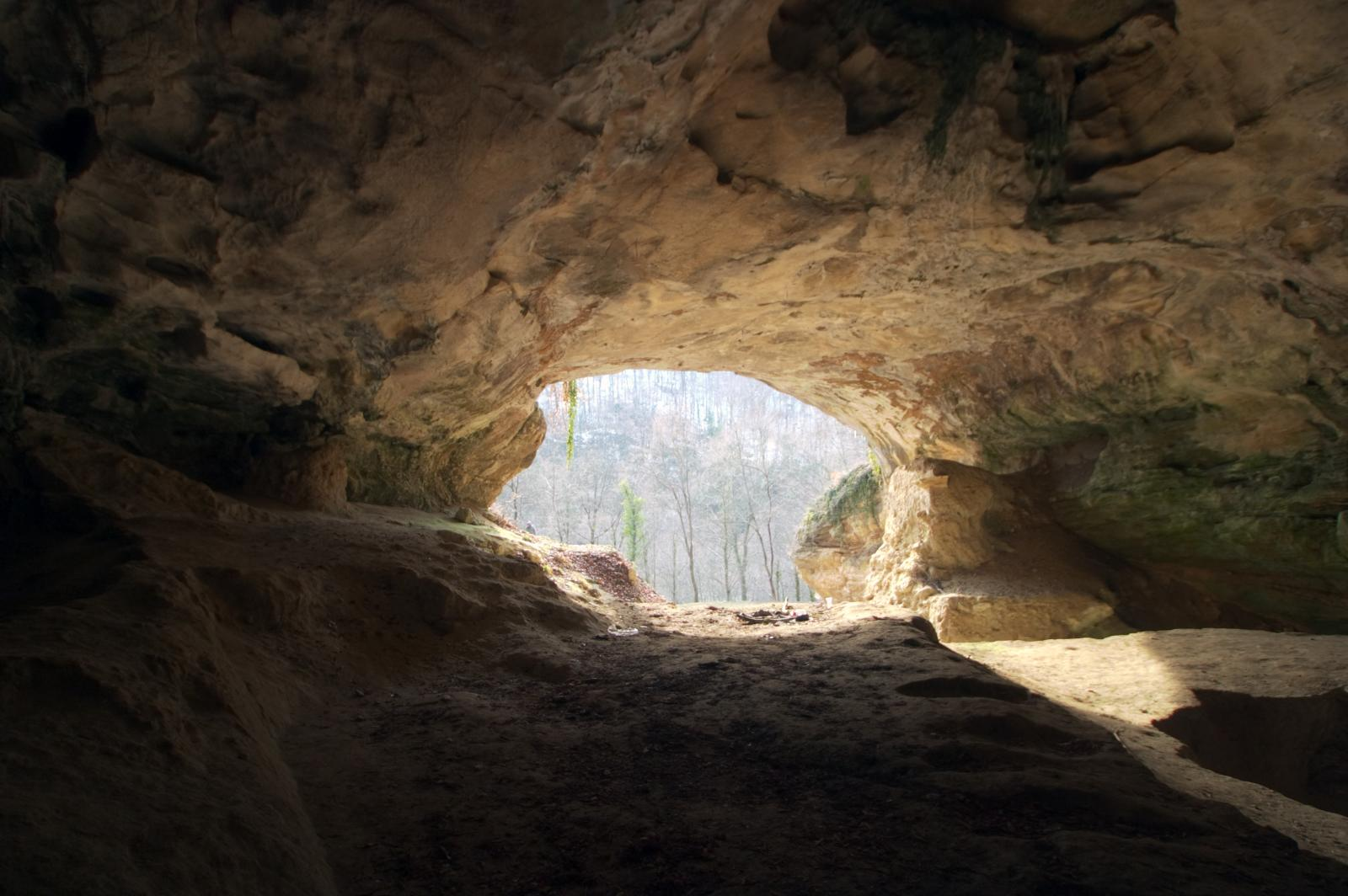
- Vindija Cave

- Location within Croatia Location within Europe
- 46.301562°N 16.079687°E
- Periods: Paleolithic
- Associated with: Neanderthals, Paleo-humans
- Location: Donja Voća
- Region: Hrvatsko Zagorje

Site notes
- Height: 20 metres (66 ft)
- Length: 50 metres (160 ft)
- Width: 28 metres (92 ft)
- Archaeologists: Mirko Malez

Vindija Cave is an archaeological site associated with Neanderthals and modern humans, located in the municipality of Donja Voća, northern Croatia. Remains of three Neanderthals were selected as the primary sources for the first draft sequence of the Neanderthal genome project in 2010. Additional research was done on the samples and published in 2017.

== Description ==
The cave is located roughly 20 km (12 mi) west of the city of Varaždin and 10 km (6.2 mi) north of Ivanec. It is estimated that Neanderthals used the cave 40,000 years ago; approximately 8000 years before modern humans lived in that part of Europe.

The hominid specimens at level 3G are regarded as unquestionably Neanderthal in overall morphology but exhibit a number of traits that sit closer to anatomically modern Europeans than to the traditional Neanderthal. These include a thinner and less projecting brow ridge, reduced facial size, and narrower front teeth. Though some have put these differences down to the small size of the Vindija individuals, a study conducted in 1995 established that the Vindija Neanderthals, though small, were of comparable size to more morphologically classic Neanderthals such as La Ferrassie 2, Shanidar 1 and 4, and Tabun 1. More likely, the Vindija Neanderthals were in transition from the classic robust form to a more gracile one.

== Dating ==
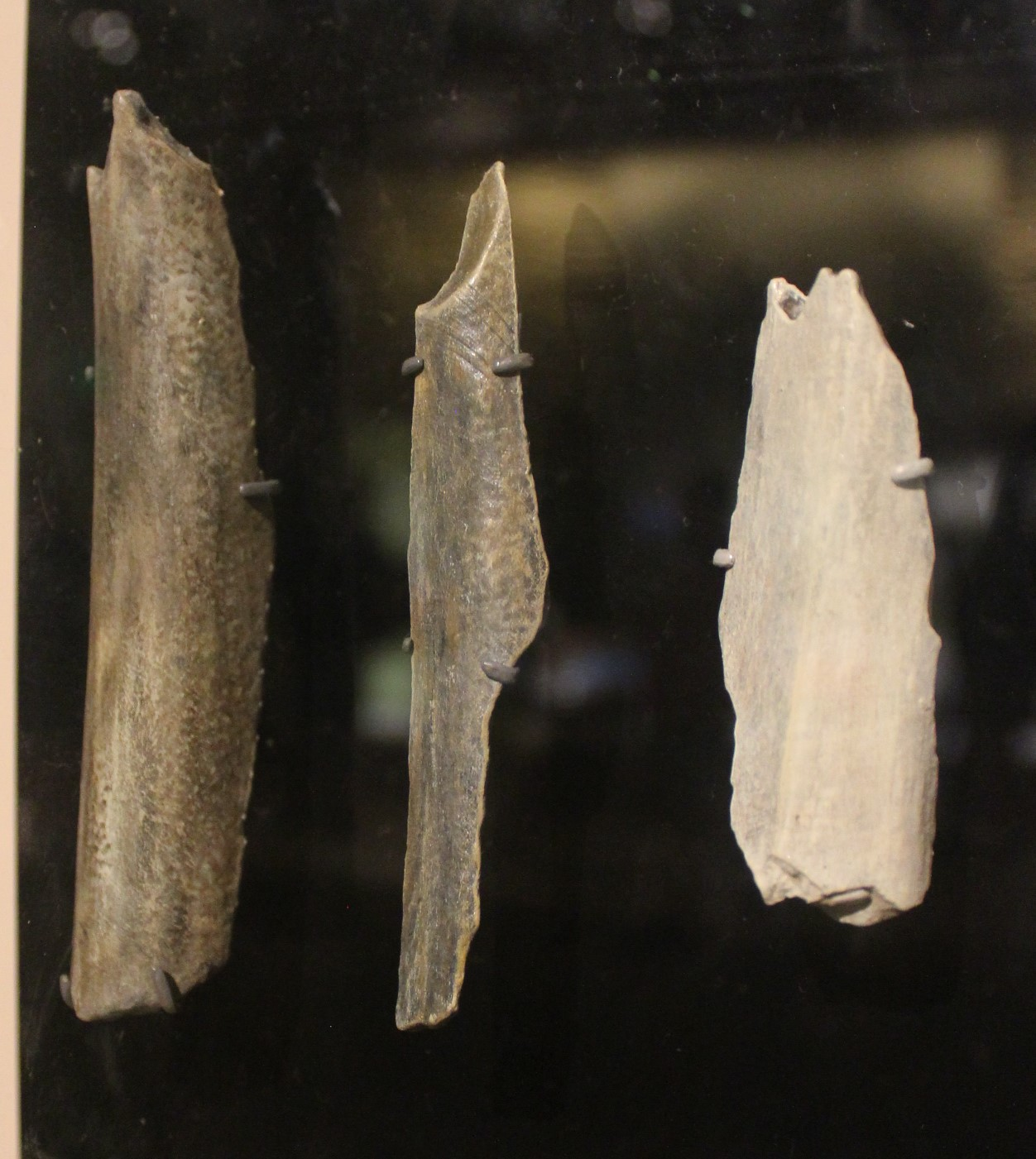
Neanderthal limb fragments from Vindija Cave, National Museum of Natural History

The Neanderthal remains at Vindija were found in a Mousterian context; some of the remains occurred in a level with some mixed Aurignacian artefacts. Several of the Neanderthal samples from Vindija also yielded surprisingly late dates when directly dated, yielding dates as late as 28,000–29,000 BP. This led to suggestions that Neanderthals might have survived longer than previously thought and that the Neanderthals at Vindija might have lived concurrently with modern humans. However, later dating methods using more advanced techniques revealed that these earlier dating results were erroneous. The erroneous dates were due to contamination by modern carbon, as minute amounts of modern contamination may result in large errors for very old samples.

In 2017, researchers from the Oxford Radiocarbon Accelerator Unit applied a new technique using AMS ultrafiltration based on the extraction of hydroxyproline to directly date several samples from Vindija Cave. Their direct AMS dating results show that the Neanderthal finds at Vindija are older than 44,000 BP. Since this is earlier than the arrival of the first modern humans to the region, the Vindija Neanderthals most likely did not intermix with modern humans.

== Archaeogenetics ==
In 2010, the first draft sequence of the Neanderthal genome was reconstructed primarily from three low coverage genomes from Vindija Cave, taken from Vindija 33.16, Vindija 33.25 and Vindija 33.26.

Prüfer et al. (2017) sequenced a high coverage genome from Vindija 33.19. At around 30-fold coverage, Vindija 33.19 is the second high coverage Neanderthal genome to be sequenced, after the Altai Neanderthal from Denisova Cave. In 2018, researchers sequenced a low coverage genome from an undiagnosed bone fragment, Vindija 87 (directly dated to around 47,000 BP) and concluded that the fragment most likely came from the same individual as Vindija 33.19.

Devièse et al. (2017) applied collagen peptide mass fingerprinting, and Zooarchaeology by Mass Spectrometry (ZooMS), to sort through several unidentified fossil fragments recovered from Vindija Cave. They successfully identified a new Neanderthal fossil fragment, Vindija *28. Most of the fossil fragments that were identifiable by ZooMS were classified as belonging to Ursus. This was confirmed by Slon et al. (2017) who tested a soil sample from Vindija for mitochondrial DNA (mtDNA). Most of the classifiable mtDNA was ascribed to Ursus, coming predominately from Ursus ingressus.

Hajdinjak et al. (2018) found that the individuals Vindija 33.16, Vindija 33.25, Vindija 33.26 and Vindija 33.19, were genetically closest to each other than any other Neanderthal individuals on record. DNA analysis revealed that Vindija 87, and thus most likely Vindija 33.19, was female. The Vindija Neanderthals were also found to be genetically closer to other late European Neanderthals, to the exclusion of the Mezmaiskaya Neanderthals from Mezmaiskaya cave in the Caucasus.

Modern humans share more alleles with Vindija 33.19 and Mezmaiskaya 1 than with the Altai Neanderthal. With the addition of the Vindija 33.19 genome, researchers revised upwards the percentage of human DNA in non-Africans introgressed from Neanderthals and were able to identify additional phenotypic variants in humans that are derived from Neanderthals.

== See also ==
- History of Croatia before the Croats
- Krapina Neanderthal site
- List of caves on Macelj and Ravna gora
- Multiregional origin of modern humans
- Neanderthal genome project
- Peștera cu Oase
