= List of caves on Macelj and Ravna gora =

The first longer list of caves to encompass Ravna gora was Redenšek 1961,˙ but the first dedicated specifically to this mountain was complied by Zlatko Smerke and published in the 1980 Ravna Gora monograph. A speleological cadastre was published in 2009 titled Završni izvještaj projekta Izrada speleološkog i biospeleološkog katastra Ravne gore with additions in 2011 and since then updates have only been made to local and national cadastres.

More recently, exploration has expanded to the Macelj massif, of which Ravna gora is often considered a part.

Names	Depth	Length	State	Number	Elevation	Coordinates	Sources
Ašov 1							
Belski ponor							
Belščica špilja (Note: Belščica polušpilja)	0	5				46.27907°N 16.0486°E	
Berajterova špilja	0	5.8		HR02476		46.28534°N 15.95057°E	
Brezovec polušpilja							
Bršljanova špilja (Note: Bršljanka, Pećina u Krči)	0.9	6.4		HR03682		46.2900°N 16.0429°E	
Ciglarova cinkalica (Note: Cinkalica pri Zdencu, Cinkalica jama kod Zdenca)			Danger! Waste.		311	46.285515°N 16.059075°E	
Cimerjanka	16	?		HR01488		46.2724°N 15.9926°E	
Cingolica	8	50		SI09331	345	46.30947°N 16.00621°E	
Cinkalica 2						46.2933°N 16.0346°E	
Cinkalica 4 (Note: Romanova nada)	10.5	?	Danger! Waste. Danger! Biowaste.	HR01749		46.28153°N 16.03814°E	
Cvetličanka		5.6					
Dijetalna špilja		6.3					
Dobrica						(Note: "u blizina izvora Dobre vode i potoka Leprnjaka")	
Duplja jama	8.5	?		HR01513	539	46.281676°N 15.99087°E	
Dopoljanščica (Note: Dopolanščica, Cerjanska Dopoljanščica, Cerjanska špilja, Kraljeva špilja, Čardak špilja, Repnjak špilja)	0	?		HR02397	274	46.275198°N 16.059680°E	(Note: ˙˙˙˙˙˙˙˙˙˙˙˙˙)
Furkica (Note: Pećinica I/II)	0.4	5.7		HR04548			
Galovićeva jama	14.1	?		HR00292		46.2788°N 16.0428°E	
Gjaba		3					
Gliboka jama	30.6					46.2799°N 16.0456°E	
Goranska Klepa (Note: Goranska klepa)	14	?	Danger! Waste.	HR01518		46.276215°N 16.043065°E	
Grohot (Note: Pećinica I/II)	0	16.2		HR04405			
Izvor iznad Jelovac jame					563	46.277218°N 15.995256°E	
Jadekova jama (Note: Jama u Velikim Vrtanjima)	16	?		HR01515	434	46.285554°N 16.015107°E	
Jama Ipsilon	5.5	6.6		HR01006		46.2785°N 16.0035°E	
Jama kod Šestana							
Jama na istočnoj strani Kuča gore (Note: Jama na istočnoj strani Kuća gore)			Danger! Waste.		425	46.289211°N 16.039665°E	
Jama na Lengešici (Note: Jama na Langeščici, Jama uz stazu)	13.5	?	Danger! Waste.	HR01857	372	46.278542°N 16.045432°E	
Jama na Roščici	4.5	9.5	Danger! Waste.	HR04296		46.23724°N 16.01423°E	
Jama na vlaki iznad Vraca							
Jama na Vracima					536	46.279253°N 15.987754°E	
Jama pod cestom (Note: Čardak jama, Jama Tri prikolice)	8	17	Danger! Waste.	HR00216		46.27595°N 16.06007°E	
Jama uz cestu iznad Velikih Vrtanja	4				470	46.284740°N 16.011563°E	
Jama 2 uz cestu iznad Velikih Vrtanja					470	46.290194°N 16.005278°E	
Jamski park							
Jelovec jama (Note: Lisnjača)	12	18		HR01489	525	46.276773°N 15.992562°E	
Jurišina špilja	2.5	26.0		HR03475		46.2777°N 16.0164°E	
Kapelica jama (Note: Jama na Fromenščini)	13.5	?	Danger! Waste.	HR01519		46.27458°N 16.0439°E	
Kolapsirana jama na Kuča gori					400	46.289203°N 16.040496°E	
Konjska jama (Note: Kjn v jmu pou, Žarovnica)	10	?			556	46.267994°N 16.002601°E	
Koralka (Note: Špilja pod jugoistočnim grebenom Kuča gore)	1	6.9		HR04007		46.290763°N 16.039202°E	
Kraljić pećina			Buried.				
Krivčeva jama	11	75		SI09238	530	46.23924°N 15.76666°E	
Kuča jama (Note: Cinkalica 1, Jama Tri žabe i tri daždevnjaka)	14.7	17.4		HR03965	448	46.288913°N 16.039777°E	
Kukelj sjever polušpilja	0	4				46.2940°N 16.0366°E	
Kukelj sjever špilja	14	?		HR01524		46.293861°N 16.036898°E	
Kukelj 1	0	6		HR01520		46.291887°N 16.032305°E	
Kukeljka	0	8.2		HR03793		46.2938°N 16.0360°E	
Lažna zvonarka		5.5					
Ledenica kod Bednjice (Note: Ledenica špilja više sela Bednjice)	0	12		HR01523	486	46.280842°N 15.975585°E	
Lisičja špilja	1	5.9		HR03540		46.2739°N 16.0136°E	
Mačkova špilja (Note: Mačkova pećina, Velika špilja kod Goranca, Poljanska špilja, Polanjska špilja, Dupljenska špilja, Višnjica)	9.5	51.5		HR01855	378	46.284744°N 16.032184°E	
Mađaronova hižica							
Markov skok (Note: Grobnica, Cinkalica 3)	18	24.0	Danger! Waste. Danger! Biowaste.	HR03436	410	46.277070°N 16.041044°E	
Matekova polušpilja	3						
Mrzle ruke	14.5	17.5		HR02851		46.2816°N 16.0094°E	
Nova jama u Velikim Vrtanjima	3						
Nova špilja dužine 6m							
Plitvička špilja	4.5	10		HR01522		46.32499°N 16.12613°E	
Pod balkonom 1	0.6	8.6		HR04112		46.2686°N 15.9875°E	
Pod balkonom 2	0	6.4		HR03535		46.2686°N 15.9875°E	
Poležečki (Note: Špilja poležećki)							
Polušpilja iznad slapa Tam de kobila šči	3					46.325°N 16.125°E	
Ponor na Cimerplacu (Note: Cimerplac ponor)			Danger! Waste.			46.27685°N 15.99793°E	
Ponor u Ravnoj gori (Note: Sklonište Partizana)							
Ponor kod Jelovec jame (Note: Ponor jama kod Jelovec jame)						46.277176°N 15.990779°E	
Prava zagorska jama	4.1	5.0		HR03664		46.2852°N 16.0091°E	
Puževa špilja							
Radni ponedjeljak	11.7	12.2		HR04071		46.2760°N 16.0249°E	
Slap i polušpilja Tam de kobila šči (Note: De kobila šči)	4					46.32589°N 16.12576°E	
Sotinska špilja	0.2	7.5		HR03780		46.2852°N 16.0291°E	
Sveti Josip	4	5.2	Danger! Waste.	HR00741		46.22943°N 15.99884°E	
Školjkača	0	16		HR01521		46.32831°N 16.13104°E	(Note: ˙˙˙˙˙˙˙)
Šincekova špilja (Note: Vinica špilja, Gorušnjak)	0.5	13		HR01417		46.3269°N 16.12868°E	(Note: ˙˙˙˙˙˙˙˙˙˙˙˙˙)
Škedenj (Note: Škedelj špilja)	6			HR01512	285	46.270803°N 16.023748°E	(Note: ˙˙˙˙˙˙˙˙)
Smećica	6.4	9.9	Danger! Waste.	HR03691	390	46.29087°N 16.03972°E	(Note: ˙˙)
Špilja kod Dobre vode	0	6		HR01517	398	46.269641°N 16.002566°E	(Note: ˙˙˙˙)
Špilja na Kuča gori (Note: Špilja na Kuća gori)	0	5.3		HR03982		46.29103°N 16.04031°E	(Note: ˙)
Špilja pod Butinom (Note: Spilja pod Butinom)	10	20	Danger! Waste. Danger! Biowaste.	HR01525		46.27336°N 16.05393°E	(Note: ˙˙˙˙˙˙)
Špilja uz cestu iznad Velikog Vrtanja (Note: Špilja uz cestu u Velikim Vrtanjima)		4				46.2848°N 16.0099°E	
Špiljica na Kuča gori	1.5	4				(Note: SE ridge of Kuča gora)	
Švecova špilja	0	11		HR02478		46.2800°N 15.9744°E	(Note: ˙)
Tisina špilja (Note: Tisovka, Polušpilja u Krči, Poluspilja u Krči)	0	7.6		HR03922	280	46.289503°N 16.043175°E	(Note: ˙˙˙˙˙)
Tubasta špilja							
Trafter	8.5	20		HR00749		46.27772°N 16.04533°E	(Note: ˙)
Vihra špilja (Note: Vihra špiljica)	0	?		HR01511	290	46.274209°N 16.022164°E	(Note: ˙˙˙˙˙)
Vila jama (Note: Vilinska špilica, Vilina jama)	20	?		HR01487	613	46.265769°N 15.995710°E	(Note: ˙˙˙˙˙˙˙˙)
Vindija (Note: Križnjakova jama, Križnjakova špilja)	1.1	51.5		HR03594	275	46.301562°N 16.079687°E	(Note: ˙˙˙˙˙˙˙˙˙˙˙˙˙˙˙˙˙˙˙˙)
Višnjička špilja	0	5.1		HR04125		46.2836°N 16.0114°E	(Note: ˙)
Vranjka jama	6	?		HR01516	568	46.279916°N 16.015730°E (Note: Kraševski zviri have coordinates to the NW.)	(Note: ˙˙˙˙˙˙˙˙˙˙)
Vučilnica špilja	0	5		HR01856	449	46.284875°N 15.996239°E	(Note: ˙˙˙)
Vutla peć							(Note: ˙˙˙)
Zdenec pri Ciglaru (Note: Zdenac pri Ciglaru, Skočmen spilja, Ciglarova špilja)	2	?		HR01514	251	46.283904°N 16.061029°E	(Note: ˙˙˙˙˙˙˙˙˙˙˙˙˙˙)
Zvonareva špilja (Note: Bušnja špilja)	0	9.1		HR04408		46.26°N 15.97°E	(Note: ˙˙)

== See also ==
- List of Dinaric caves

== Notes ==
=== Legend ===
Dry cave (Note: Rarely flooded.)	Partly wet cave (Note: At least one entrance dry but at least one passage with flowing water.)	Wet cave (Note: At least one entrance rarely dry.)	Submerged cave (Note: Rarely exposed.)	Cave with complex hydrological regime (Note: For example with seasonal variation.)
