= Mezmaiskaya Cave =

Cave and archaeological site in Russia

Coordinates: 44°10′N 40°00′E

- Мезмайская пещера (Russian)
- Area around Mezmaiskaya Cave

- Location in Russia Mezmaiskaya Cave (Europe) Mezmaiskaya Cave (Russia)
- Type: limestone karst
- Periods: Paleolithic
- Associated with: Homo neanderthalensis
- Location: Sukhoi Kurdzhips
- Region: Republic of Adygea, North Caucasus, Russia

Site notes
- Elevation: 1,310 m (4,300 ft)

Mezmaiskaya Cave (Russian: Мезмайская пещера) is a prehistoric cave site overlooking the right bank of the Sukhoi Kurdzhips (a tributary of the Kurdzhips River) in the southern Russian Republic of Adygea, located in the northwestern foothills of the North Caucasus in the Caucasus Mountains system.

== Archaeology ==
=== Neanderthal ===
Initial excavations in the Mezmaiskaya Cave recovered Mousterian artifacts of the Last glacial period. The Late Middle Paleolithic stratigraphic layers at Mezmaiskaya are composed of seven layers, dating from roughly 70,000 to 40,000 BP.

Three Neanderthal individuals were recovered from the cave. The first, Mezmaiskaya 1, was recovered in 1993 and is an almost complete skeleton in a well preserved state due to calcite cementation that covers and holds the arrangement in place. It was assessed to be an infant about two weeks old, making it the youngest Neanderthal ever recovered. Although no burial pit was found, circumstances suggest that the body was buried intentionally, explaining the good state of preservation and the lack of scavenger marks. Mesmaikaya 1 was recovered from Layer 3, the oldest Late Middle Paleolithic layer at the site. Mezmaiskaya 1 is indirectly dated to around 70–60,000 years old.

Additionally, 24 skull fragments of a 1- to 2-year-old Neanderthal child - Mezmaiskaya 2 - were found in 1994. A recovered tooth was assigned to Mezmaiskaya 3. Mezmaiskaya 2 was recovered from Layer 2, the youngest Late Middle Paleolithic layer, and directly dated to around 44,600-42,960 cal BP. DNA analysis reveals that Mesmaiskaya 2 was male.

=== Archaeogenetics ===
Ancient DNA was recovered for a mtDNA sequence showing 3.48% divergence from that of the Neanderthal 1, found some 2,500 km (1,600 mi) to the west in Germany. Phylogenetic analysis places these two specimen in a clade distinct from modern humans, suggesting that their mtDNA types have not contributed to the modern human mtDNA pool.

Mezmaiskaya 2 is genetically closer to other late European Neanderthals, including Neanderthals from Vindija Cave, Spy Cave and Goyet Caves, than the older Mesmaiskaya 1, which indicates that a population replacement of Neanderthals likely occurred in the Caucasus. This gap in time is consistent with Marine isotope stage 3.

Modern humans and Ust'-Ishim man share more alleles with all other Neanderthals, including Mezmaiskaya 1, than with the Altai Neanderthal from Denisova Cave, which shows that the introgression event from Neanderthals into humans likely took place after the split of the lineage of the Altai Neanderthal from that of other Neanderthals, but before the split of the lineage of Mezmaiskaya 1 and that of other Neanderthals.

=== Fauna ===
Faunal remains show a very low degree of weathering, with many bones having traces of stone tool cuts and carnivore modification. The most common large mammals are steppe bison (Bison priscus), Caucasian goat (Capra caucasica), and Asiatic mouflon (Ovis orientalis). Reindeer (Rangifer tarandus) remains were encountered for the first time in the Caucasus.

Although most of the smaller vertebrate remains appear to have been accumulated by nonhuman processes (for example, owl predation), the majority of the ungulate remains probably represent animals hunted by the occupants of the Mousterian culture.

Analysis of the animal bones found in the Mezmaiskaya Cave revealed that during the middle and late Paleolithic four kinds of buffalo lived in the area.

== Description ==
The cave entrance is a hole in the cliff several meters high, behind which the course is narrowed to a few meters, but almost all along remains quite high. Within a few tens of meters of the entrance to the cave, the floor is transformed from rocky to clay.

== Geology ==
Evidence recovered from the cave suggests that the Campanian Ignimbrite eruption around 40,000 years ago may have been a setback for the Neanderthal, with an as yet only postulated eruption contributing to their demise about 29,000 years ago.

== See also ==
- Archaic human admixture with modern humans
- Neanderthal genome project
