= Krapina Neanderthal site =

Archaeological site in Croatia

- Hušnjakovo brdo (Croatian)
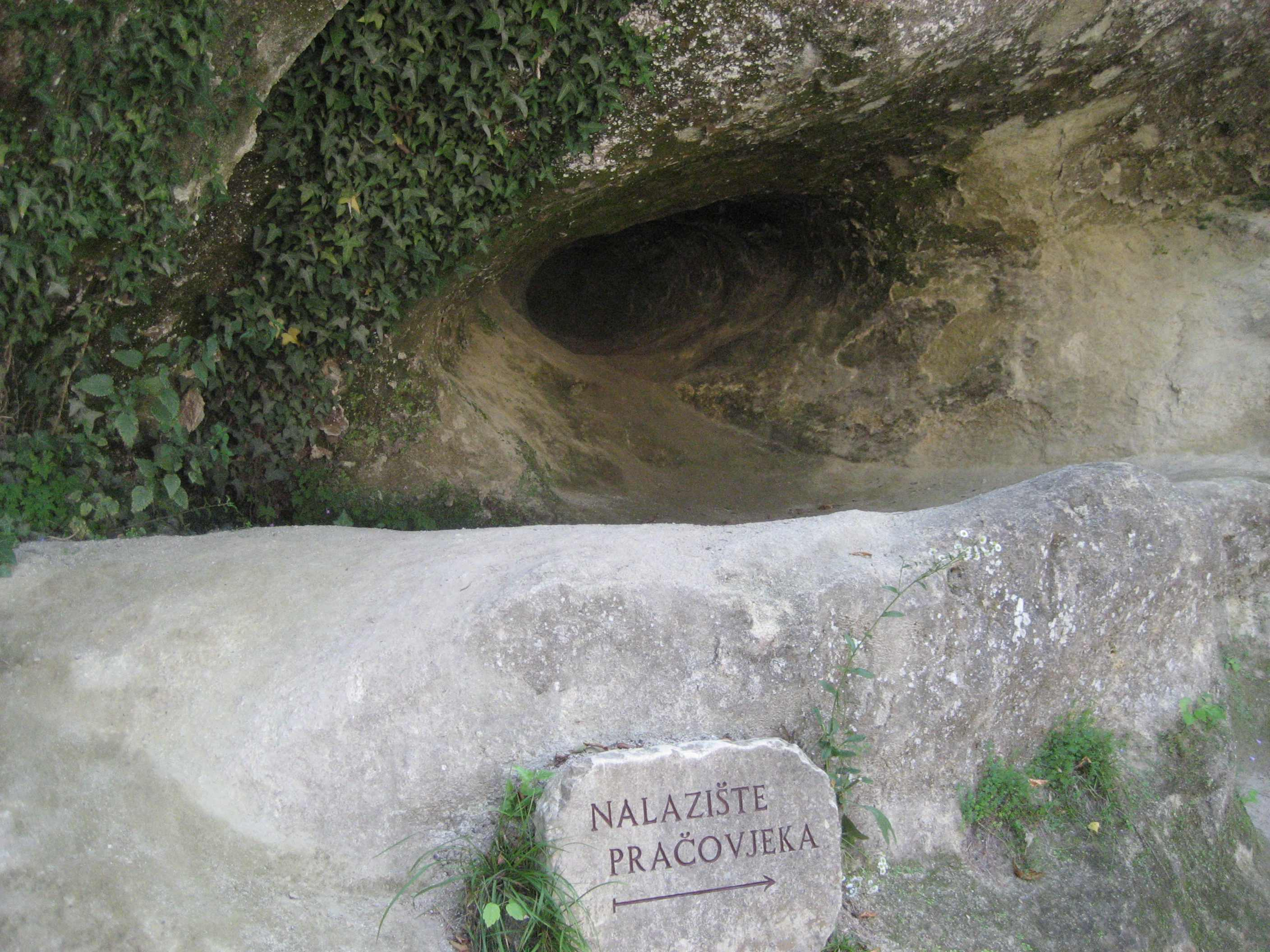
- Hušnjakovo Hill finding site

- Location within Krapina-Zagorje County Location within Croatia Location within Europe
- 46°9′53″N 15°51′49″E
- Periods: Palaeolithic
- Cultures: Mousterian
- Associated with: Neanderthals
- Location: Western part of Krapina
- Region: Krapina-Zagorje County, Croatia

Site notes
- Excavation dates: 1970
- Archaeologists: Dragutin Gorjanović-Kramberger
- Management: Krapina Neanderthal Museum
- Public access: Yes
- Website: https://mkn.mhz.hr/

Krapina Neanderthal site, also known as Hušnjakovo Hill (Croatian: Hušnjakovo brdo) is a Paleolithic archaeological site located near Krapina, Croatia.

At the turn of the 20th century, Dragutin Gorjanović-Kramberger recovered faunal remains as well as stone tools and human remains at the site. Krapina represents the largest known recovery of human skeletal remains from any Upper Pleistocene site.

== Site history ==
The site was first discovered by Dragutin Gorjanović-Kramberger, who excavated the site between 1899 and 1905 and subsequently published two monographs, which were the first publications on the Neanderthals found here. The prehistoric site itself is located in a collapsed cave, nestled in a sandstone bluff overlooking the Krapinica River in Hrvatsko Zagorje.

More recently, it was determined that the site was about 120–130 kyr. Researchers determined its date by using ESR and U-series dating. The methods were also used for determining the age of the artifacts and human remains found in the site.

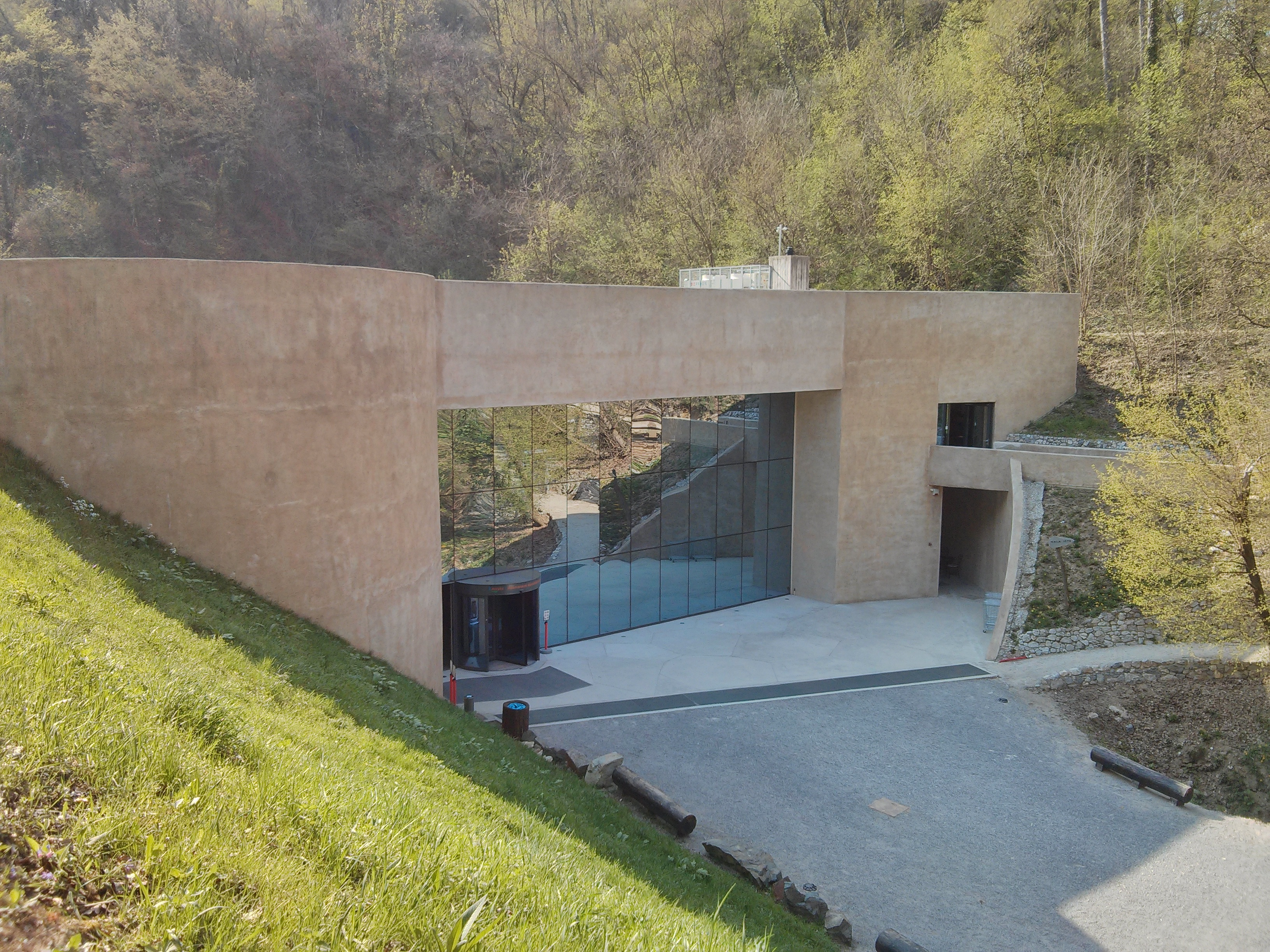
Krapina Neanderthal Museum

== Krapina museum ==
The Krapina museum's main goal was to recognize the lives of the Neanderthal and give insight on evolution. The museum was also known for its fossils as well as the reconstructions.

The first museum near this site was opened on May 10, 1952. Called the Heritage Museum of Krapina, it showcased the total history of the area, beginning with select prehistoric Neanderthal finds, and up to the Yugoslav Partisans. By 1966, two more exhibitions were added: the family pictures of Dr. Ljudevit and the ethnography exhibition. During this time, there was no museum dedicated specially to the Neanderthals.

The idea of a specialized museum was first brought forward in 1999. As the adaptation and renovation of already existing structures appeared to be more expensive than building a new one, the idea of making a new one from the ground up was accepted. As such, by 2002. work on the new museum began.

The new museum was completed in 2010. It was built into a small hill, with the majority of the building front being made of glass. The entrance to the building opens up into a large oval atrium of grey concrete, the opposite of which is a broad screen which continuously plays documentary films on Krapina Neanderthals. The passage up to the second floor is of a circular shape, with museum pieces being placed in the open space, as well as along the painted walls.

== Material culture ==
1191 lithic artifacts were discovered during the century of research at the site, and were found in all ten geologic levels as defined by Gorjanović-Kramberger. Stone tools are most common in levels 3 and 8, which are the levels in which the hominid fossils were found as well.

According to the Middle Paleolithic typology set out by François Bordes, the Krapina lithic assemblage can be categorized as Mousterian, with a mix of various tool classes. The assemblage is dominated by side-scrapers, comprising more than half of all stone tool finds, which would classify it as Charentian Mousterian. Upper Paleolithic finds are rare, as are Levallois blanks. Six rock types were used in production of stone tools: volcanic tuff, silicified tuff, cherts, quartz aggregates, opals or chalcedonies, and rocks of effusive origin. Tuffs and silicified tuffs were used most often (65%), while cherts compromise ~23% of the artifacts.

== Symbolic behavior ==
=== Hypotheses on cannibalism and burials ===
Gorjanović-Kramberger was first to propose the possible existence of cannibalism among the Krapina Neanderthals, in 1901. He based this assumption on three factors: mixing of animals and human skeletal remains, breaking of long bones (in order to access the marrow), and the fact that not a single skull was found in a non-broken state. The idea of possible cannibalism was supported by a number of subsequent scientists, such as Mirko Malez, H. Ulrich and K. Tomić Karlović.

The extreme fragmentation and the occasional burning traces and cranial fragments suggested that Krapina Neanderthals committed cannibalism. Percussion marks on split tibia fragments, opened marrow channels in humerus, radius, ulna and femur point to marrow extraction. Additionally, breakage patterns and blow marks on skull fragments specify perimortem skull fracturing for removing the brain. In 1985, anthropologist Trinkaus hypothesized that the skulls were broken because of sediment pressure and movement, and the pieces were separated postdepositionally. He attributes the scattered and incoherent parts of the skeleton to the collapse of rocks, the activities of other mammals, man-made activities like the construction of hearths near the buried skeletons and sedimentary settling of the deposits and so on. Another anthropologist, Russell, hypothesized in 1987 that the remains of the Krapina hominid were defleshed in preparation for the secondary burial.

Others have seen the damage on bones as a result of a secondary burial or other ritual actions, which may have included cannibalism. As such, the meat may have been exposed to nature for animals, or it could have been removed using sharp stone tools. In fact, incisions on certain individuals aren't consistent with either scalping, cannibalism, defleshing or any other post-mortem activity. They may have been the result of symbolic marking as a part of a yet unknown Neanderthal ritual. As such, the question of whether Krapina Neanderthals engaged in cannibalism remains open.

=== Care for the injured ===
Remains of 11 individuals exhibited signs of injuries that healed during their lifetimes, which wouldn't have been possible without the care of the community.

- Krapina 4, 5, 20 and 31 show evidence of small blunt trauma, which would have resulted in short term pain and blood loss, and would have required cleaning. It may have also resulted in short term cognitive impairment, long term possibly asymptomatic.
- Krapina 34.7 shows evidence of a significant depressed parietal skull fracture. It would have resulted in significant pain, blood loss and inflammation of the wound. Aside from help in cleaning and dressing the wound, the community might have cared for an individual who exhibited short term, and possible long term cognitive disturbance.
- Krapina 106 and adult Krapina 110 show a high degree of degeneration to the C4 and C7 cervical spinal nerves. It would have limited the mobility of the individuals, as well as their range of motion. If the nerves were affected by degeneration, the individuals would have required constant care.
- Krapina 120.71 had a fragmented rib with signs of fibrous dysplasia. If the dysplastic neoplasm was asymptomatic no care would have been necessary, but a symptomatic neoplasm would have required a high level of care.
- Krapina 149 showed evidence of a fractured, and well-healed, right clavicle. It would have caused pain and limited movement for a few weeks, during which the individual would need care.
- Krapina 180 showed evidence of fracture and nonunion of the right ulnar bone, that might have later resulted in an amputation. The initial fracture would require to bones to be set back into place, and would have limited the use of the arm for a few weeks to months. Individual and group behavior would have been modified to accommodate the individual if the arm was indeed amputated.
- Krapina 188.8 had a fracture and bowing of the left ulnar bone. The injury would have required splinting and care for several weeks.

=== Other Krapina recoveries ===
Krapina 3 was a skull recovered by Gorjanović-Kramberger, which he initially identified as Cranium C. When discovered, the skull was missing the left side. The cranium is said to be of an adult woman.

=== Personal ornamentation ===
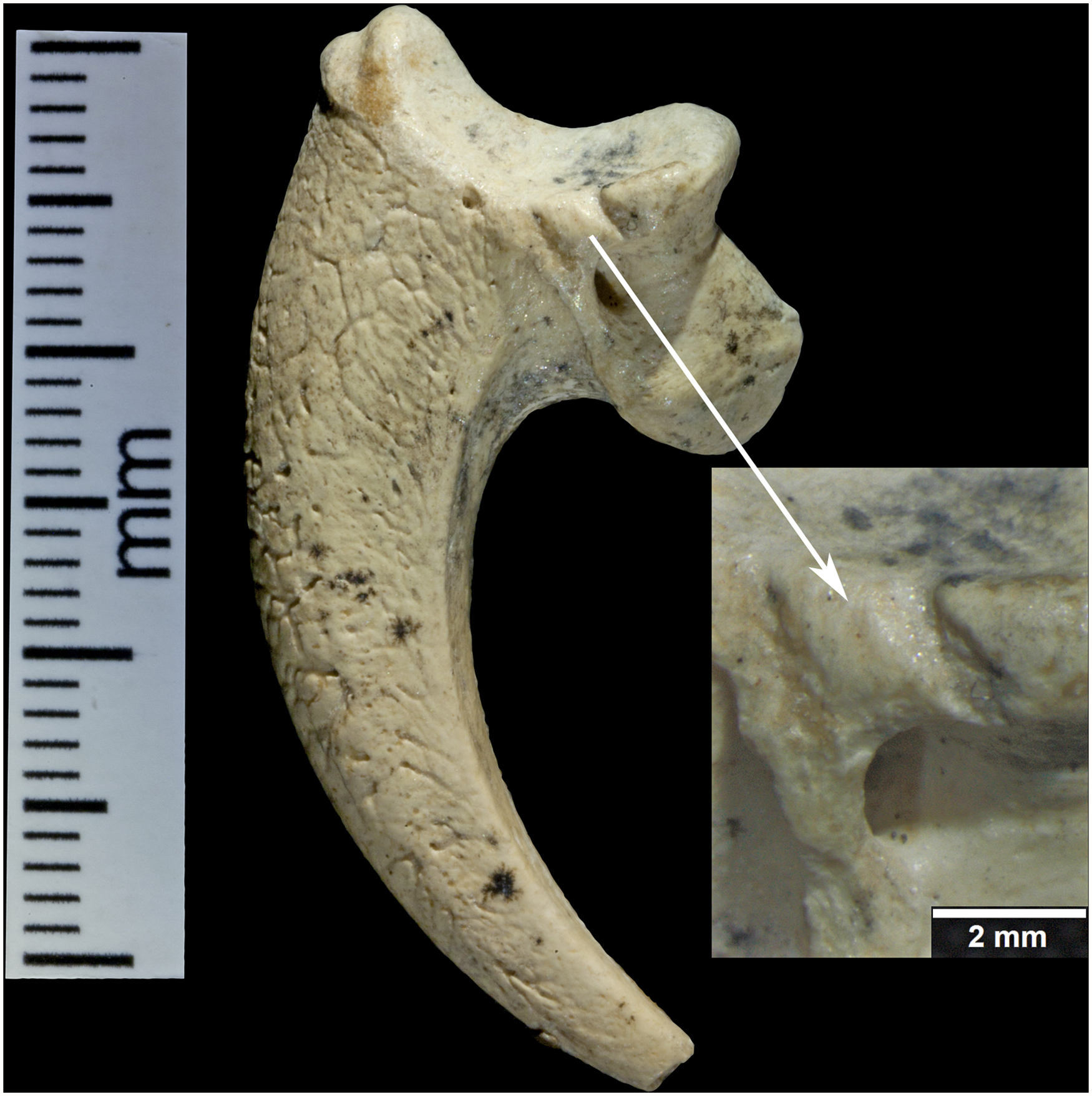
White-tailed eagle talons from Krapina

Eight white-tailed eagle talons and one foot phalanx were found at the site, and were dated by uranium–thorium dating to 130 000 BP. All of them contain evidence of modification on medial and lateral edges, in form of cut marks, nicks and polishing. They don't have any drilled holes, which suggests that the talons were worn after being tied around their proximal margins. Pigments of ochre and black pigment were found on the surface. Traces of animal fiber were also found, implying one or more of the talons were bound into an assemblage.

After Gorjanović-Kramberger recovered the talons from the site he cataloged and sent them to be identified by Lambrecht. Lambrecht identified the talons from a white-tailed eagle. In the same site they were able to recover twenty-nine different bird species. Among those birds, the majority were eagles and owls. While analyzing the talons they saw that they were the only ones with changes made by someone.

== Skeletal remains ==
In the sandy deposits of the cave about nine hundred specimens of fossilised human bones were found - the fossil remains belonged to several dozen different individuals, of different sex, from 2 to 40 years of age. According to anthropologist Herbert Ullrich, calculating the minimum number of individuals (MNI) for Krapina is an arduous task, because of the fractured or fragmented condition of the bones and incomplete data for the precise stratigraphic location of most fragments. The majority of the Krapina human remains are split and scattered bones with no associated elements: there are no mandible with matching cranium, no femur with matching tibia, no humerus with matching ulna, etc. Approximate MNI estimates vary significantly: 10 to 75-82 (teeth only), but the most credible minimum published the number of individuals is 23–35.

Some scientists believe around 80 individuals are represented, and that the fossils found here were accumulated in a relatively short period of time 130 thousand years BP. Others place the number of individuals as low as 27.

Krapina's Neanderthal remains represent the largest and most complete hominid collection known, with almost all parts of the human skeleton being found at the site.

=== Skull ===
Around 80 individuals are represented by craniodental remains. Based on reconstruction of the fragmented remains through 3D modeling, an average cranial capacity was set between 1326–1359 cm^{3}, which is slightly larger than among anatomically modern humans. Several children cranial remains were found in Krapina as well, whose reconstruction shows that Krapina Neanderthals show an identical pattern of secondary altriciality as modern humans do, although they had a more primitive speed of brain growth. The Krapina Neanderthals exhibit a morphology of the occipital bone common to most other Neanderthals.

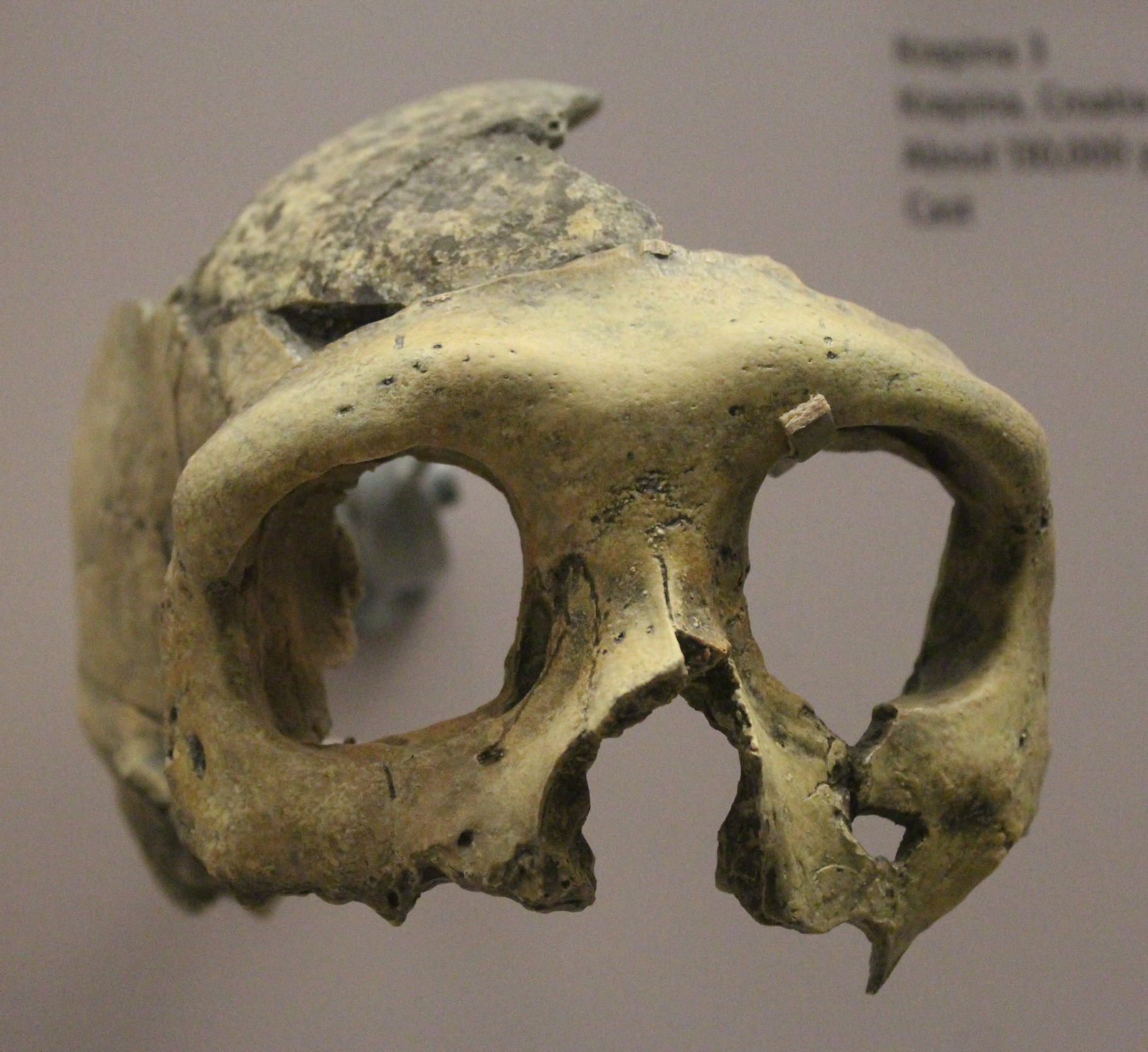
Replica of Krapina 3, National Museum of Natural History

The cochlear labyrinth volume was successfully reconstructed for the Krapina Neanderthals as well. The volume is similar to those found in modern humans, which suggests Krapina Neanderthals had a range of audible frequencies similar to them as well.

=== Spine ===
Three samples of the first cervical vertebra were found among the Krapina Neanderthal sample. Two of the three samples presented anatomical variations, which differs from the anatomically modern humans. As such, the Krapina sample, taken in conjunction with first cervical vertebra found at Sidrón Cave, seems to confirm such anatomical variation in Neanderthals. Prevalence of different anatomical variants in hominids has been linked with several diseases, low genetic diversity and inbreeding.

=== Teeth ===
Some Neanderthal anterior teeth show traces of unusual and excessive gross wear, which is usually indicative of non-dietary tooth use. The most common explanation for such tooth wear is the "stuff and cut" scenario, according to which teeth are used as a "third hand" for grasping materials that required additional processing with tools. Examples of such use is animal hide preparation, basketry tasks, wood softening, as well as tool production and retouching. Chipping found on both anterior and posterior teeth further confirms the theory that Krapina Neanderthal's used their teeth for non-masticatory tasks. Such chipping has been found in sub-adult dental remains as well.

KDP 20, also known as Krapina Dental Person 20, is represented by four mandibular teeth. All four of these teeth show various traces of grooving and enamel scratching, which implies that the Neanderthal attempted to alleviate tooth pain through a direct, mechanical approach.

== See also ==
- Vindija Cave
- List of Neanderthal sites
