= Dragutin Gorjanović-Kramberger =

Croatian paleontologist, geologist and archaeologist

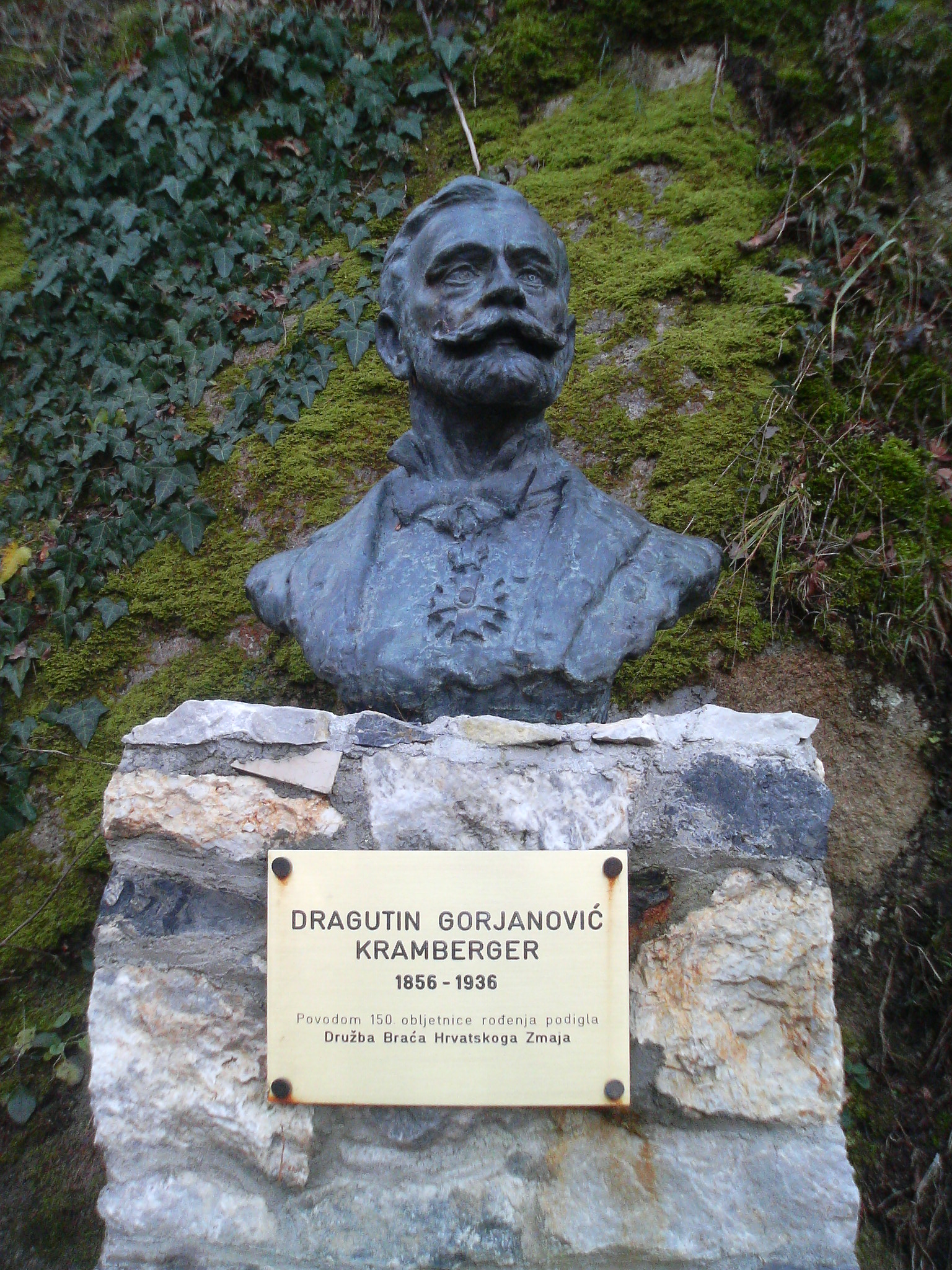
- Bust of Gorjanović-Kramberger in Krapina
- Born: 25 October 1856; Zagreb, Kingdom of Croatia, Austrian Empire
- Died: 24 December 1936 (aged 80); Zagreb, Kingdom of Yugoslavia

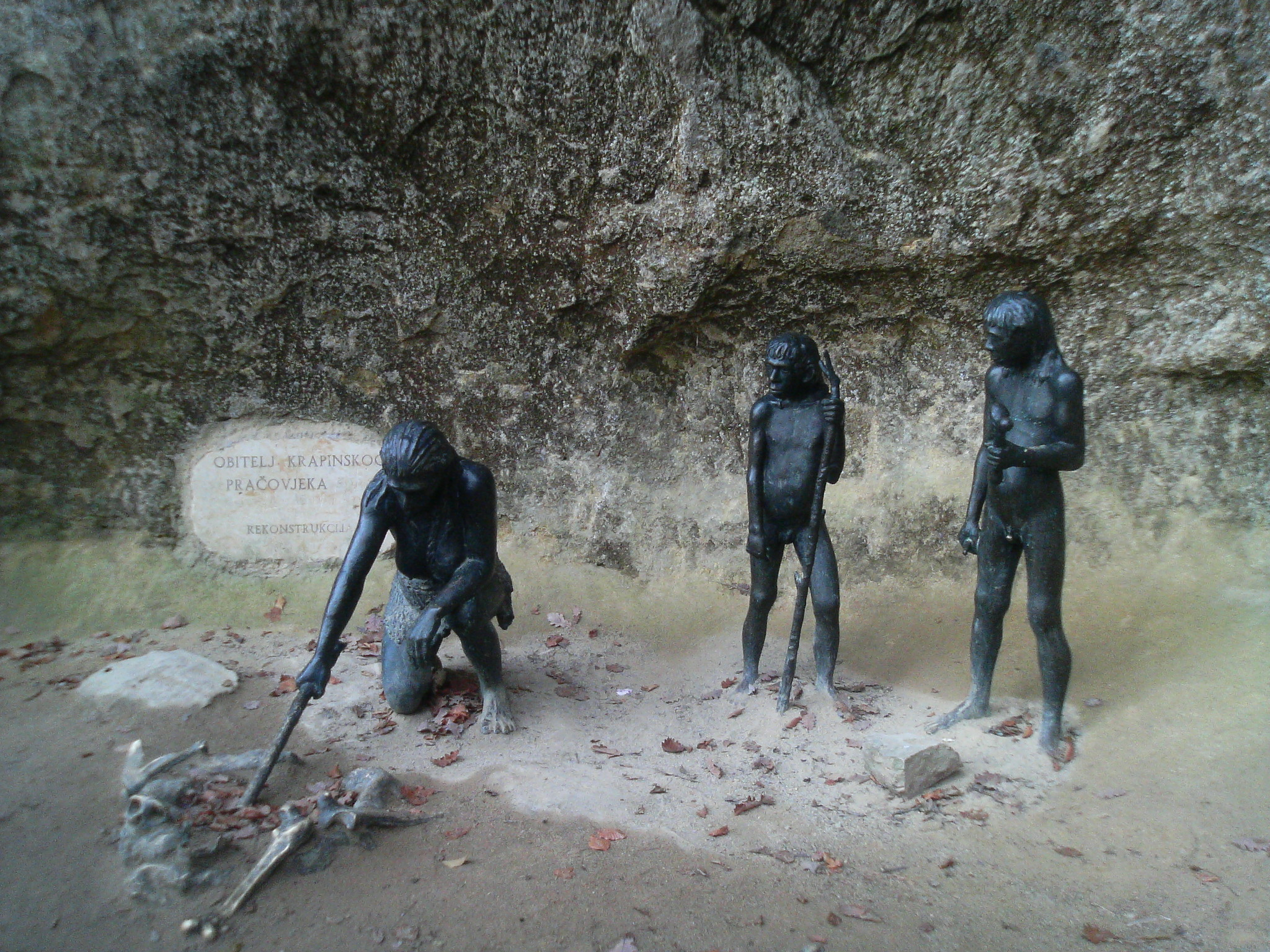
A display at Krapina

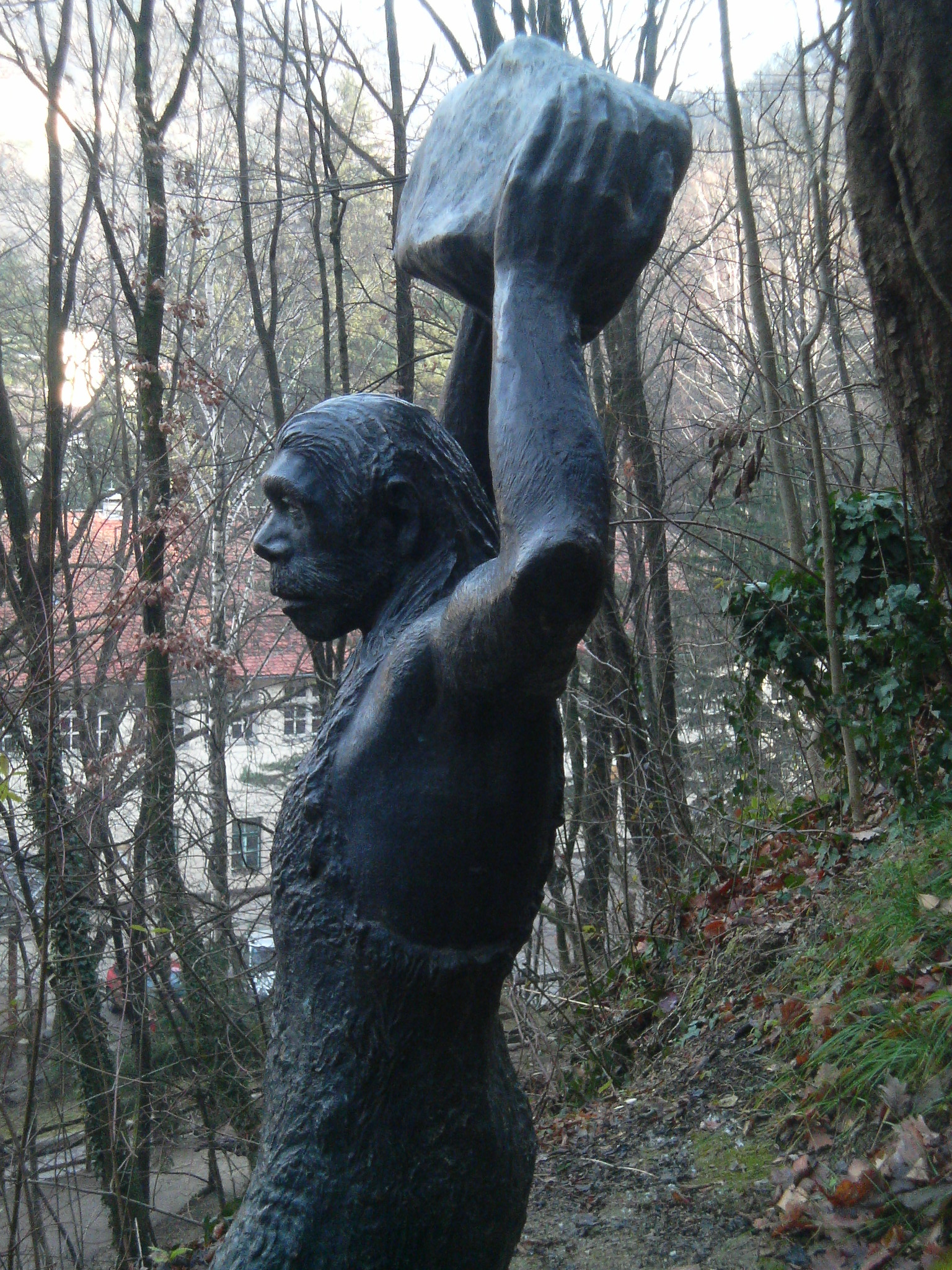
A display at Krapina

Dragutin Gorjanović-Kramberger (25 October 1856 – 24 December 1936) was a Croatian geologist, paleontologist and archaeologist.

== Education ==
Dragutin finished his elementary education in Zagreb, Croatia, as well as two years of preparandija (Faculty of Teacher Education, University of Zagreb). He started studying paleontology in Zurich, Switzerland. Soon, he moved to Munich, where his lecturer was Karl Zittel, a world-renowned expert in the areas of anatomy and paleontology. He received a doctoral degree in 1879, (Tübingen, Germany), with work related to fossilized fishes.

From 1880, he was curator at the Mineralogical Department of the Croatian National Museum (today the Croatian Natural History Museum) and, in collaboration with his superior, archaeologist Đuro Pilar, he started mapping Mount Medvednica, a mountain just north of Zagreb. In 1890 he changed his family name to Gorjanović.

== Lecturing ==
His lecturing career started in 1883 at the Faculty of Philosophy of the University of Zagreb, where he taught paleontology of vertebrates. In 1884 he was appointed assistant, later was associate, and finally full professor, in 1896. In 1893 he became head of the Geological-Paleontological Department of the Croatian National Museum. He was engaged in paleontology, stratigraphy, tectonics, paleoclimatology, applied geology, geological mapping, and hydrography. Gorjanović-Kramberger discovered, described, classified, systemized, aged, and determined environments for numerous new species of fossilized fishes. As a young scientist at the end of the 19th century, he had already published more than fifty works in prestigious European scientific journals.

== Krapina ==
In 1899 on Hušnjak hill, near the Croatian town of Krapina, he discovered a very rich Neanderthal site, the Krapina Neanderthal site of an early man today known as Krapina Man (Croatian: Krapinski pračovjek). News of the discovery quickly spread all around Europe and beyond. Gorjanović continued extensive scientific research of osteological human material, fauna, ecological conditions, and the life and culture of people once living in Croatia. While analyzing the finds, he noticed unusually big variations among the bones.

With time he realized that evolution was the source of variability which created human individuals of different stature. His analysis and interpretation of fossil remains proved the existence of early humans which he called Homo primigenius, an ancestor of modern man. Later on those finds were classified as Homo neanderthalensis. Gorjanović-Kramberger's research helped prove the theory of evolution of human species, and his theories have influenced the social view of the world.

He started the study of skeletons relating to modern humans and developed a technique that analyzes the fluorine in bones to calculate their age. In 1895 he used newly discovered X-rays to analyze inner bone structure. Results of his research related to the finds at Krapina could be found in the monograph "O diluvijalnom čovjeku iz Krapine", (Der Diluviale Mensch von Krapina in German; "On the diluvial man of Krapina"), which was published in Wiesbaden in 1906. The publication was the most comprehensive work ever written in the area of the paleontology of man.

== Works ==
In 1909, he founded the Geological Commission for Croatia and Slavonia, with the goal of carrying out geological mapping and research in pedology. The Croatian geological service became independent from the Geological Institute in Budapest and eventually became the present-day Hrvatski geološki institut (Croatian Geological Survey) in Zagreb.

Gorjanović-Kramberger published more than 230 papers in Croatian and international journals during his career. He made a couple of geological maps. He was an honorary doctor of the University of Zagreb, a member of the Association of Medical Doctors and Croatian Natural Sciences Association, and an honorary citizen of Zagreb, Karlovac, and Krapina. Gorjanović-Kramberger was a member of nine foreign scientific associations. From 1891, he was an associate member and from 1909 a full member of the then Yugoslav Academy of Sciences and Arts. Gorjanović-Kramberger remained active after his retirement. Between 1899 and 1929, he published 53 works related to discoveries at the Krapina site.

== See also ==
- List of fossil sites (with link directory)
- List of hominina (hominid) fossils (with images)
