= Sidrón Cave =

Cave and archaeological site in Spain

- Cueva del Sidrón
- Location in Spain Sidrón Cave (Spain) Sidrón Cave (Europe)
- 43°23′10″N 5°19′42″W
- Type: karst
- Periods: Paleolithic
- Associated with: Neanderthals
- Location: Piloña municipality
- Region: Asturias

Site notes
- Public access: no

The Sidrón Cave (Asturian: Cueva del Sidrón) is a non-carboniferous limestone karst cave system located in the Piloña municipality of Asturias, northwestern Spain, where Paleolithic rock art and the fossils of more than a dozen Neanderthals were found. Declared a "Partial Natural Reserve" in 1995, the site also serves as a retreat for five species of bats and is the place of discovery of two species of Coleoptera (beetles).

== Description ==
The total length of this huge complex is approximately 3,700 m (12,100 ft), which contains a central hall of 200 m (660 ft) length and the Neanderthal fossil site, called the Ossuary Gallery, which is 28 m (92 ft) long and 12 m (39 ft) wide.

In 1994, human remains were found accidentally in the cave. They were initially suspected to be from the Spanish Civil War because Republican fighters used to hide there; however, later analysis shows that the remains actually belong to Neanderthals.

=== Galería del Osario ===
The primary gallery of interest at the Sidron cave is the Ossuary Gallery or Tunnel of Bones (Galería del Osario), where the remains of several Neanderthals were found. The Galería del Osario was excavated from 2000 to 2013. The Neanderthal remains were all recovered from a single layer, Stratum III.

The associated archaeological assemblage consists of 53 stone tools; nonhuman bones are very scarce. The only other species present of similar size is red deer. The remains of a few small mammals and gastropods were also found.

== Neanderthal finds ==
Researchers recovered more than 2500 hominin fossil elements from the site. The minimum number of individuals from Sidrón Cave is 13. The age of these remains of three men, three adolescent boys, four women, and three infants has been estimated to about 49,000 years.

The fact that the bones are excellently preserved with very limited erosion and no large carnivore tooth marks and the unusual deposition of the bones, mixed into a jumble of gravel and mud, suggests that these Neanderthals did not die in this spot but an exterior location. A number of scenarios of how these "members of an extended family" might have ended up in a 6 m^{2} (65 sq ft) room-sized space, dubbed the Tunnel of Bones included flooding, cave collapse, and disposal by cannibals. Evidence for cannibalism includes "the presence of cut marks, flakes, percussion pitting, conchoidal scars, and adhering flakes". Researchers suppose that they were dropped into the cave in a single event via a collapse of nearby fissures above the site or by influx of stormwater.

=== Samples ===
Lab number	Material	Normalized Age	Stratum
OxA-21776	bone	48400 ± 3200	Galeria del Osario III
Beta-192065	tooth SID-19	40840 ± 1200	Galeria del Osario III
GifA-99704	Hominid bone SID-00B	49200 ± 2500	Galeria del Osario III
Beta-192066	Hominid bone SID-20	37300 ± 830	Galeria del Osario III

=== Morphology ===
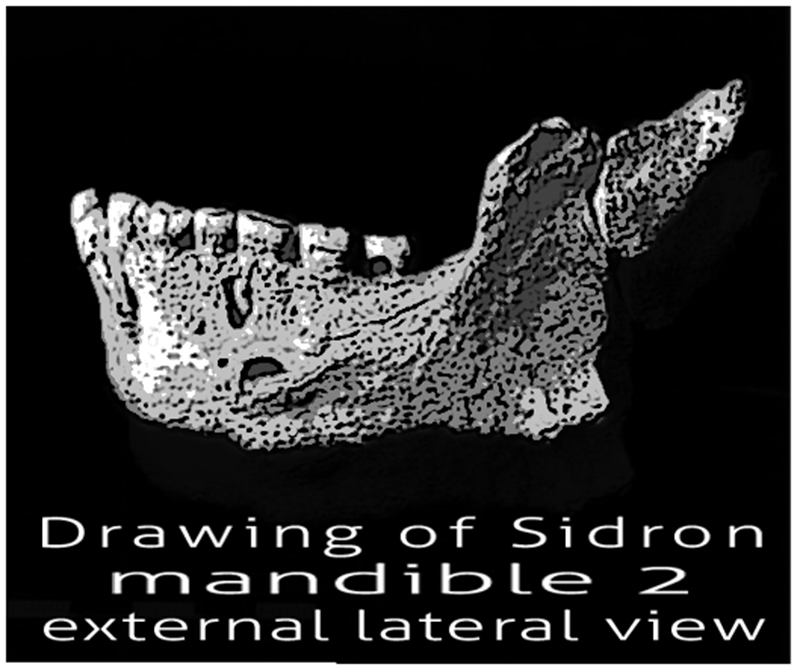
Sidron mandible

Morphologically, the El Sidrón humans show a large number of Neanderthal lineage-derived features even though certain traits place the sample at the limits of Neanderthal variation. Integrating the El Sidrón human mandibles into the larger Neanderthal sample reveals a north–south geographic patterning. The cave is in the northern portion, southern Neanderthals show broader faces with increased lower facial heights.

=== Ontogeny ===
The relatively well-preserved specimen of a juvenile Neanderthal recovered from the Galería del Osario, El Sidrón J1, allowed researchers to study the ontogeny of Neanderthals. By analyzing its dentition, researchers estimate that El Sidrón J1 was between 7 and 8 years old at the time of death. Around 36% of the juvenile specimen's remains were recovered, including key cranial, dental and vertebral column elements. 138 fossil elements were recovered, including 30 dental elements and a complete mandible. Based on the robustness of the specimen, researchers guess that the specimen was likely male.

El Sidrón J1 exhibits many traits of delayed maturation. At the time of death, El Sidrón J1's brain was likely not yet fully developed. El Sidrón J1's estimated cranial capacity is 1,330 cm^{3} (81 cu in), which is around 87% of the average adult Neanderthal cranial capacity (1,520 cm^{3} (93 cu in)). At a comparable age, typical modern human juveniles reach around 95% of the average adult human cranial capacity. Additionally, the juvenile specimen exhibits an unusual developmental feature; the neurocentral synchondrosis between his thoracic and C1 vertebrae had not yet fused; typically, this fusion occurs around 2 years earlier in modern humans.

Other paleoanthropologists like Marcia Ponce de León and Christoph Zollikofer have cautioned against interpreting the brain size as a sign of delayed maturation, because of the small case number and lack of statistical evidence, and Tanya Smith noted that the assumption depends on the accuracy of the tooth's age

=== Archaeogenetics ===
Ancient Neanderthal mtDNA was partially sequenced in the HVR region for three distinct Neanderthals from El Sidrón cave (441, 1253, and 1351c). Researchers also sequenced the partial nuclear genomes from several individuals from the cave. 1253 and 1351c have the same mutations at position A-911, G-977 in exon 7 of FOXP2 gene, known as the "language gene", as found in present-day humans.

In 2017, researchers successfully sequenced DNA from soil samples taken from Stratum III at El Sidrón. They were able to identify Neanderthal mtDNA sequences; the results suggested that the sequenced mtDNA belonged to more than one individual.

==== Neanderthal Y chromosome ====
The first sequencing of the Neanderthal Y chromosome was successfully completed from a specimen from Sidrón Cave. Based on this sample, researchers estimate that Neanderthals diverged from the common human ancestor around 590,000 years ago. The Sidrón Cave Y chromosome had never been identified before from other fossil hominin specimens and is not found in modern humans. The Sidrón Cave Y chromosome coded for several minor histocompatibility antigen genes that differ from that of modern humans.

=== Diet ===
Recent research investigating the Neanderthal remains recovered from El Sidrón has provided evidence that their diet consisted primarily of pine nuts, moss and mushrooms. This is contrasted by evidence from other European locations which point to a more carnivorous diet.

== See also ==
- List of fossil sites
- Atapuerca Mountains
- Sima de las Palomas
