= Neanderthal genetics =

Genetic study of ancient Neanderthal DNA

Neanderthal genetics testing became possible in the 1990s with advances in ancient DNA analysis. In 2008, the Neanderthal genome project published the full sequence Neanderthal mitochondrial DNA (mtDNA), and in 2010 the full Neanderthal genome. Genetic data is useful in testing hypotheses about Neanderthal evolution and their divergence from early modern humans, as well as understanding Neanderthal demography, and interbreeding between archaic and modern humans.

Modern humans and Neanderthals had multiple different interbreeding episodes, but Neanderthal-derived genes in the present-day human genome descend from an episode 250,000 years ago probably in Eurasia, and 47,000 to 65,000 years ago in the Near East. While 20% of the Neanderthal genome survives today, most people only carry about a few percentage points of Neanderthal DNA, and most Neanderthal-derived DNA is non-coding. Neanderthals maintained a low genetic diversity and suffered from inbreeding depression; consequently most Neanderthal genes were probably selected out of the gene pool. Barring hybrid incompatibility or negative selection, most Neanderthal DNA may descend from the children of modern human females and Neanderthal males. Neanderthals also interbred with Denisovans in the Siberian Altai Mountains.

== Genome sequencing ==
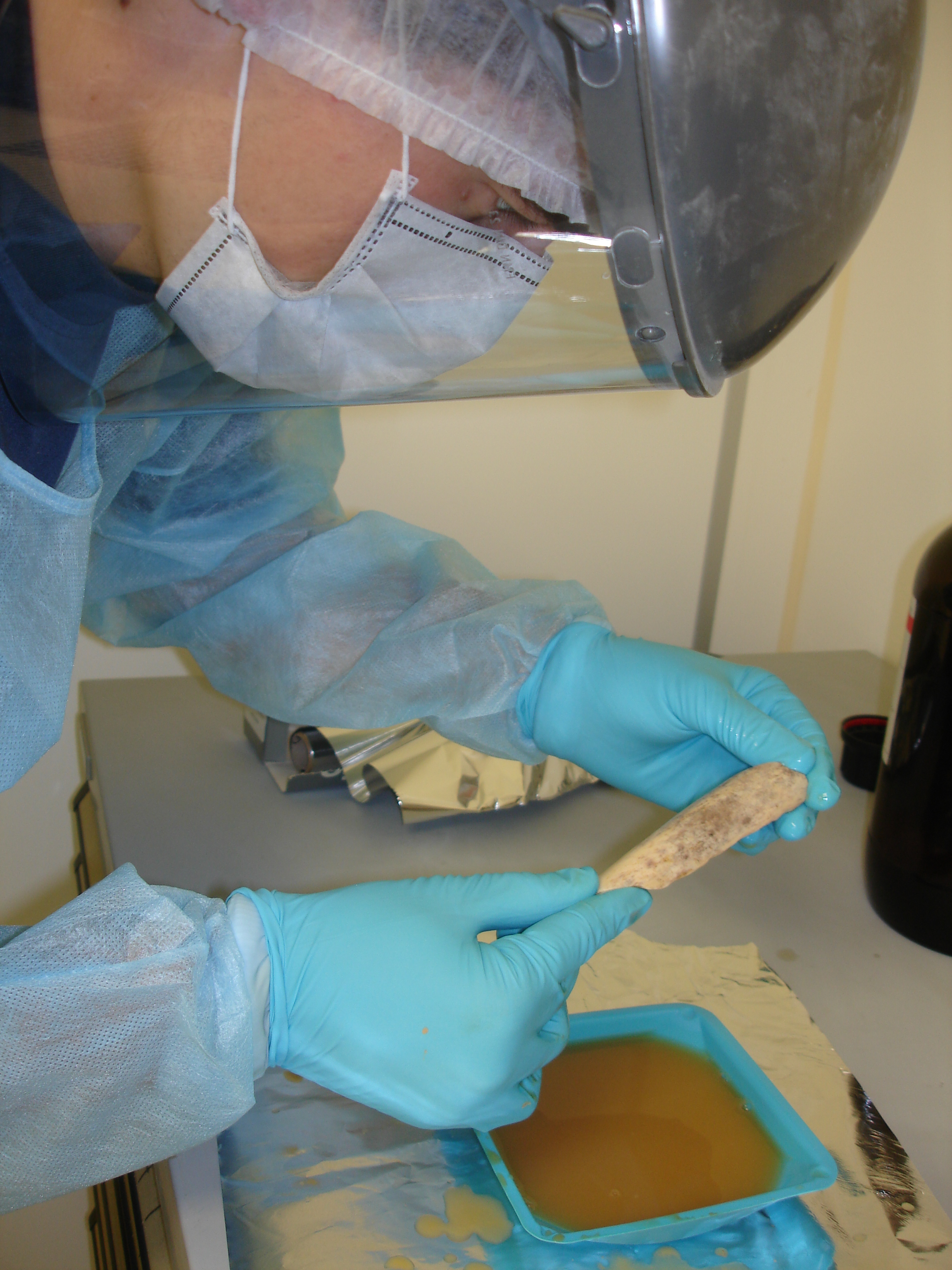
Johannes Krause, a geneticist at the Max Planck Institute for Evolutionary Anthropology in Leipzig, Germany, extracting ancient DNA in 2005.

Genetic studies on Neanderthal ancient DNA became possible in the late 1990s. In July 2006, the Max Planck Institute for Evolutionary Anthropology and 454 Life Sciences announced that they would sequence the Neanderthal genome over the next two years. It was hoped the comparison would expand understanding of Neanderthals, as well as the evolution of humans and human brains. They published the full sequence Neanderthal mitochondrial DNA (mtDNA) in 2008. Svante Pääbo noted that, "Contamination was indeed an issue," and they eventually realised that 11% of their mtDNA sample was modern human DNA. Since then, more of the preparation work has been done in clean areas and 4-base pair 'tags' have been added to the DNA as soon as it is extracted so the Neanderthal DNA can be identified.

The first Neanderthal genome sequence was published in 2010, and strongly indicated interbreeding between Neanderthals and early modern humans. This was based on three specimens in Vindija Cave, Croatia, which contained almost 4% archaic DNA (allowing for near complete sequencing of the genome). However, there was approximately 1 error for every 200 letters (base pairs) based on the implausibly high mutation rate, probably due to the preservation of the sample. In 2012, British-American geneticist Graham Coop hypothesised that they instead found evidence of a different archaic human species interbreeding with modern humans, which was disproven in 2013 by the sequencing of a high-quality Neanderthal genome preserved in a 50,000 year old toe (phalanx) bone from Denisova Cave, Siberia.

A visualisation map of the reference modern-human containing the genome regions with high degree of similarity or with novelty according to a 50,000 year old Neanderthal from the Siberian Altai Mountains has been built by Pratas et al.

Neanderthal genomes sequenced include those from Denisova Cave including an offspring of a Neanderthal and a Denisovan, from Chagyrskaya Cave, from Vindija Cave, Mezmaiskaya cave, Les Cottés cave, Goyet Caves and Spy Cave, Hohlenstein-Stadel and Scladina caves Galería de las Estatuas, Gibraltar, and Sidrón Cave.

== Evolution ==
Genetic data has been used to test various hypotheses about Neanderthal evolution and identify the last common ancestor (LCA) of Neanderthals and modern humans. Numerous dates have been suggested, such as 538–315, 553–321, 565–503, 654–475, 690–550, 765–550, 741–317, and 800–520,000 years ago; and a dental analysis concluded before 800,000 years ago.

The date of around 250,000 years ago cites "H. helmei" as being the LCA, and the split is associated with the Levallois technique of making stone tools. The date of about 400,000 years ago uses H. heidelbergensis as the LCA. Estimates of 600,000 years ago assume that "H. rhodesiensis" was the LCA, which split off into a modern human lineage and a Neanderthal/H. heidelbergensis lineage. 800,000 years ago has H. antecessor as the LCA, but different variations of this model would push the date back to 1 million years ago. A 2020 analysis of H. antecessor enamel proteomes suggests that H. antecessor is related but not a direct ancestor.

Neanderthals and Denisovans are more closely related to each other than they are to modern humans, meaning the Neanderthal/Denisovan split occurred after their split with modern humans. Before splitting, Neanderthal/Denisovans (or "Neandersovans") migrating out of Africa into Europe apparently interbred with an unidentified "superarchaic" human species who were already present there; these superarchaics were the descendants of a very early migration out of Africa around 1.9 mya. Assuming a mutation rate of 1 × 10^{−9} or 0.5 × 10^{−9} per base pair (bp) per year, the Neanderthal/Denisovan split occurred around either 236,000–190,000 or 473,000–381,000 years ago, respectively. Using 1.1 × 10^{−8} per generation with a new generation every 29 years, the time is 744,000 years ago. Using 5 × 10^{−10} nucleotide sites per year, it is 616,000 years ago. Using the latter dates, the split had likely already occurred by the time Neanderthal ancestors spread out across Europe.

== Demographics ==
Like modern humans, Neanderthals probably descended from a very small population with an effective population—the number of individuals who can bear or father children—of 3,000 to 12,000 approximately. Genetic data suggests that Neanderthals maintained this very low population, proliferating weakly harmful genes due to the reduced effectivity of natural selection. Various studies, using mtDNA analysis, yield varying effective populations, such as about 1,000 to 5,000; 5,000 to 9,000 remaining constant; or 3,000 to 25,000 steadily increasing until 52,000 years ago before declining until extinction. Archaeological evidence suggests that the modern human population at the time of the Neanderthal/modern human transition was ten times higher. Neanderthals may have been at a demographic disadvantage due to a lower fertility rate, a higher infant mortality rate, or a combination of the two. Estimates giving a total population in the higher tens of thousands are contested.

Low population caused a low genetic diversity and probably inbreeding, which reduced the population's ability to filter out harmful mutations (inbreeding depression). It is unclear how this affected a single Neanderthal's genetic burden and, thus, if this caused a higher rate of birth defects than in contemporary modern humans (Cro-Magnons). If it did, it could have contributed to the extinction of the species (mutational meltdown).

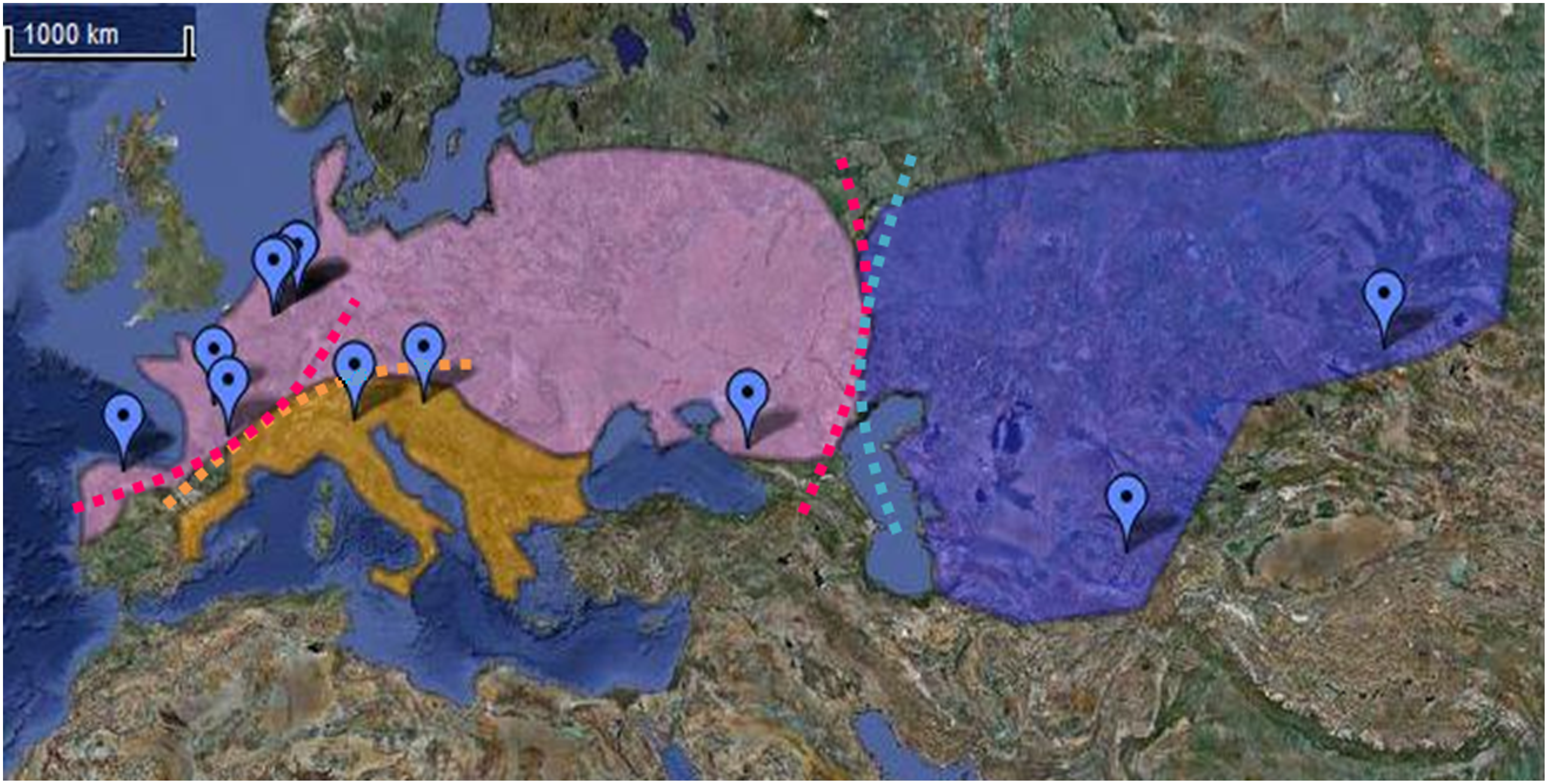
Genetically, Neanderthals can be grouped into three distinct regions (above). Dots indicate sampled specimens.

Genetic analysis indicates there were at least three distinct geographical groups: Western Europe, the Mediterranean coast, and east of the Caucasus, with some migration among these regions. Over long periods of time, there is evidence of large-scale cross-continental migration. Early specimens from Mezmaiskaya Cave in the Caucasus and Denisova Cave in the Siberian Altai Mountains differ genetically from Western European Neanderthals, whereas later specimens from these caves both have genetic profiles more similar to Western European Neanderthals than to the earlier specimens from the same locations. These suggest large-scale population replacement over time.

== Interbreeding ==
=== Interbreeding with modern humans ===
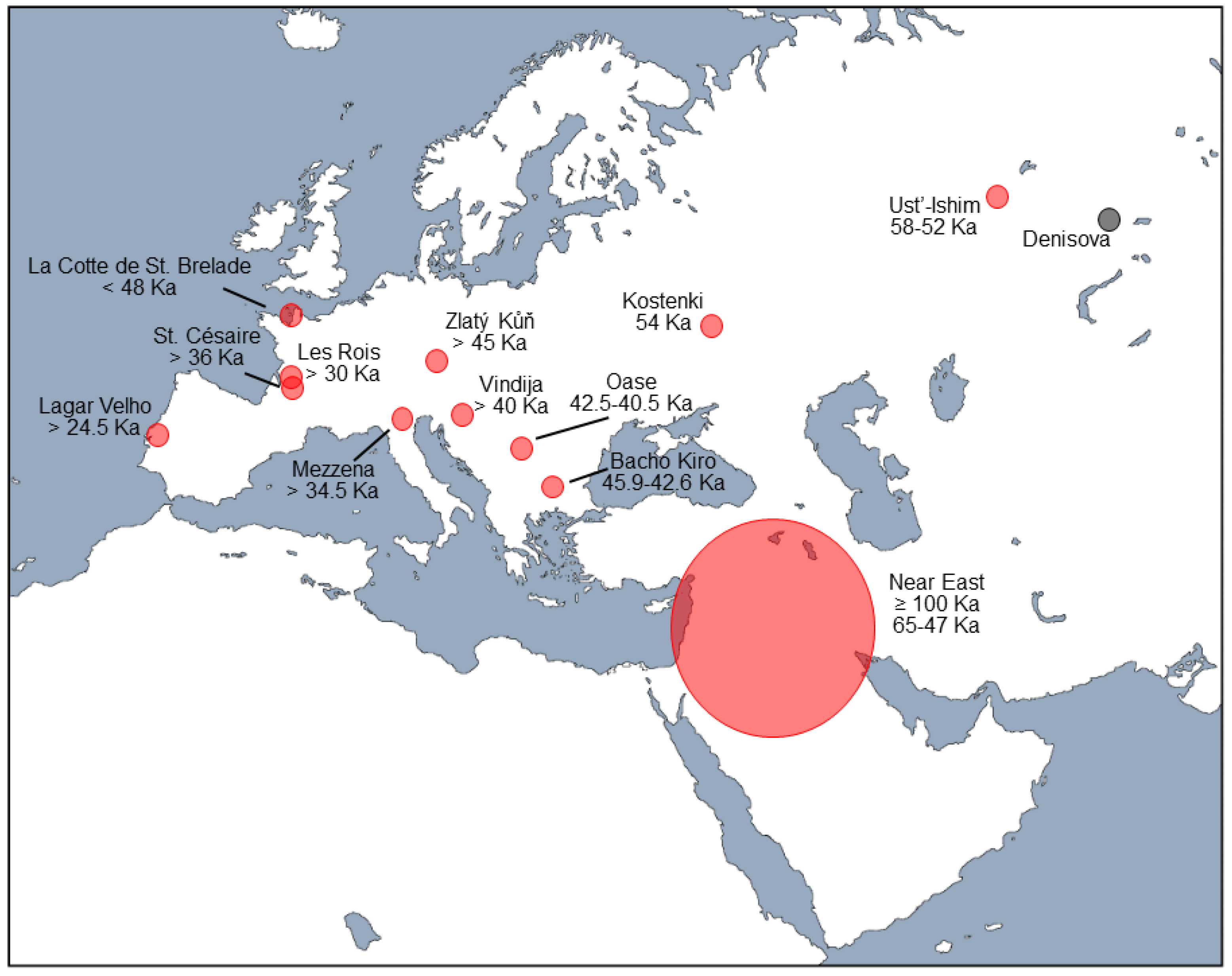
Map of western Eurasia showing areas and estimated dates of possible Neandertal–modern human hybridisation (in red) based on fossil samples from indicated sites

The first Neanderthal genome sequence was published in 2010, and strongly indicated interbreeding between Neanderthals and early modern humans. The genomes of all studied modern populations contain Neanderthal DNA. In all, approximately 20% of the Neanderthal genome appears to have survived in the modern human gene pool.

Various estimates exist for the proportion, such as 1–4% or 3.4–7.9% in modern Eurasians, or 1.8–2.4% in modern Europeans and 2.3–2.6% in modern East Asians. Pre-agricultural Europeans appear to have had similar, or slightly higher, percentages to modern East Asians. The percentage may have decreased in Europeans due to dilution with a group of people which had split off before Neanderthal introgression. Typically, studies have reported finding no significant levels of Neanderthal DNA in Sub-Saharan Africans, but a 2020 study detected 0.3-0.5% in the genomes of five African sample populations, likely the result of Eurasians back-migrating and interbreeding with Africans.

A study of 2,762 Indian genomes found that Indians get between 1% and 2% of their DNA from Neanderthals and Denisovans, and by assembling all the Neanderthal fragments the researchers were able to find 1,524 million base pairs of introgressing Neanderthal DNA and 591 million of Denisovan (compare to the human genome size of around 3000 million). With Icelanders, not as much cumulative Neanderthal DNA was found. This raises the possibility of building the full Neanaderthal genome from living humans.

==== Neanderthal-derived genes ====
While a large portion of surviving introgression appears to be non-coding DNA with few biological functions, some Neanderthal-derived genes seem to have functional implications.

Due to their small population and resulting reduced effectivity of natural selection, Neanderthals accumulated several weakly harmful mutations, which were introduced to and slowly selected out of the much larger modern human population; the initial hybridised population may have experienced up to a 94% reduction in fitness compared to contemporary humans. By this measure, Neanderthals may have substantially increased in fitness. A 2017 study focusing on archaic genes in Turkey found associations with coeliac disease, malaria severity and Costello syndrome.

Nonetheless, some genes may have helped modern humans adapt to the environment. The putatively Neanderthal Val92Met variant of the MC1R gene may be weakly associated with red hair and UV radiation sensitivity. This variant is primarily found in East Asian populations (especially Taiwanese indigenous peoples) rather than Europeans. Different modern human populations seem to have maintained certain Neanderthal-derived genes due to local evolutionary pressures; for instance, Asian populations showed clustering in functional groups related to complement and haematopoietic pathways, while Europeans showed clustering in functional groups related to the lipid catabolic process. Some genes related to the immune system appear to have been affected by introgression, which may have aided migration, such as OAS1, STAT2, TLR6, TLR1, TLR10, and several related to immune response. (Note: OAS1 and STAT2 both are associated with fighting viral inflections (interferons), and the listed toll-like receptors (TLRs) allow cells to identify bacterial, fungal, or parasitic pathogens. African origin is also correlated with a stronger inflammatory response.) Of the inherited Neanderthal genome, 25% in modern Europeans and 32% in modern East Asians may be related to viral immunity.

Neanderthal genes have also been implicated in the structure and function of the brain, (Note: Higher levels of Neanderthal-derived genes are associated with an occipital and parietal bone shape reminiscent to that of Neanderthals, as well as modifications to the visual cortex and the intraparietal sulcus (associated with visual processing).) keratin filaments, sugar metabolism, muscle contraction, body fat distribution, enamel thickness and oocyte meiosis.

==== Parentage ====
Neanderthal mtDNA (which is passed on from mother to child) is absent in modern humans. This is evidence that interbreeding occurred mainly between Neanderthal males and modern human females. According to Svante Pääbo, it is not clear that modern humans were socially dominant over Neanderthals, which may explain why the interbreeding occurred primarily between Neanderthal males and modern human females. Furthermore, even if Neanderthal women and modern human males did interbreed, Neanderthal mtDNA lineages may have gone extinct if women who carried them only gave birth to sons.

There is considerably less Neanderthal ancestry on the X-chromosome compared to the autosomal chromosomes, which similarly suggests that admixture with modern humans was primarily the result of mating between modern human females and Neanderthal males. Other authors have suggested that this may be due to negative selection against Neanderthal alleles, but these two proposals are not mutually exclusive. A 2023 study confirmed that the low level of Neanderthal ancestry on the X-chromosomes is best explained by sex bias in the admixture events, and these authors also found evidence for negative selection on archaic genes.

The lack of Neanderthal-derived Y-chromosomes in modern humans (which is passed on from father to son), has also inspired the suggestions that the hybrids that contributed ancestry to modern populations were predominantly females, or that the Neanderthal Y-chromosome was not compatible with modern humans and became extinct.

==== Timing ====
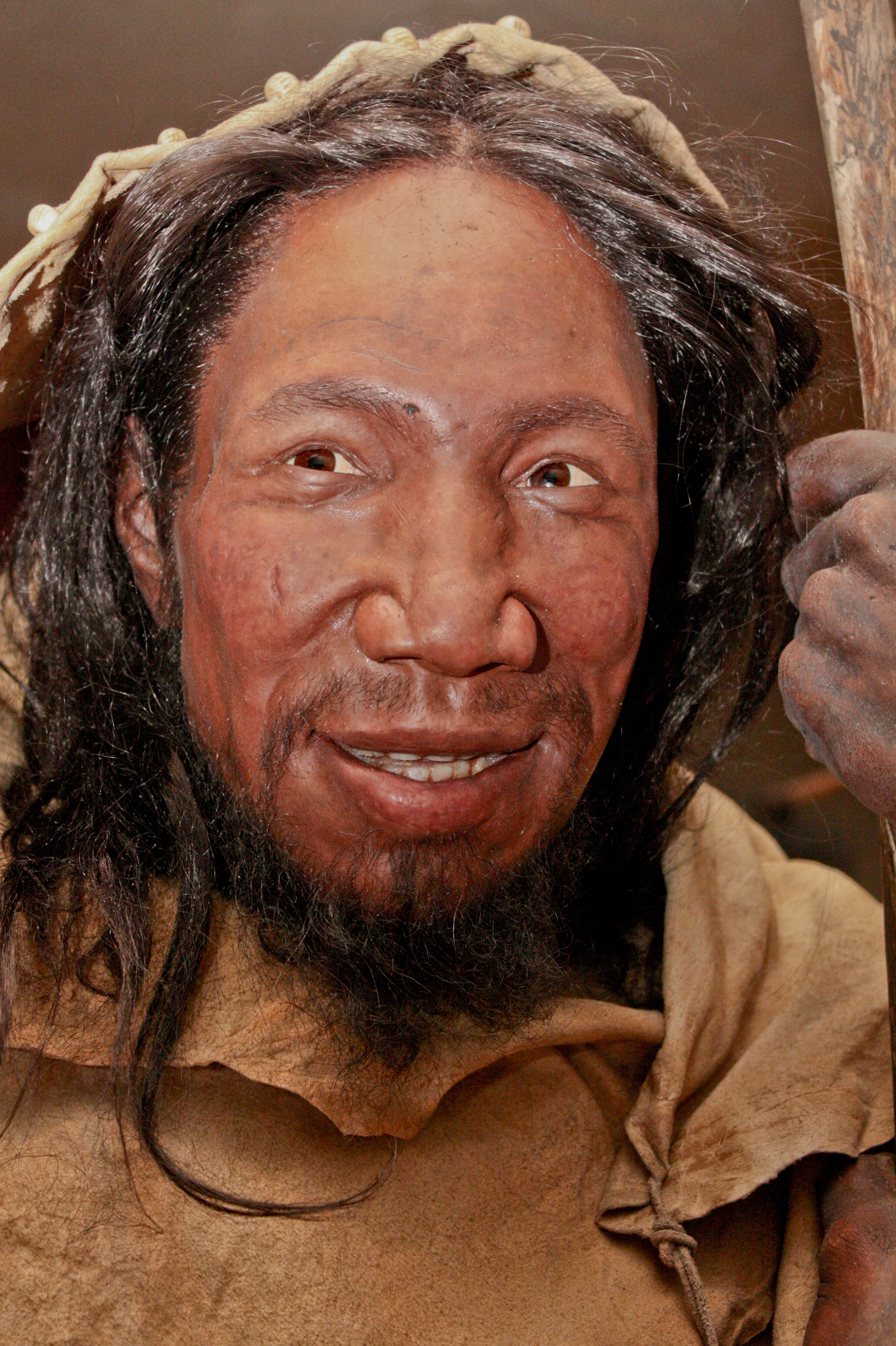
Reconstruction of the upper Palaeolithic human Oase 2 with around 7.3% Neanderthal DNA (from an ancestor 4–6 generations back)

The low percentages of Neanderthal DNA in all present-day populations indicate infrequent interbreeding, unless interbreeding was more common with a different population of modern humans which did not contribute to the present day gene pool.

According to linkage disequilibrium mapping, the last Neanderthal gene flow into the modern human genome occurred 86–37,000 years ago, but most likely 65–47,000 years ago. Neanderthals additionally came into genetic contact with modern humans during a more ancient modern humans dispersal out of Africa 250,000 years ago; this caused a 6% modern human ancestry in Neanderthal populations. Modern human mtDNA may have introgressed into Neanderthal populations possibly 268,000 to 413,000 years ago. There could have been another interbreeding episode with a population ancestral to East Asians.

Interbreeding still occurred without contributing to the modern genome. The approximately 40,000-year-old modern human Oase 2 was found, in 2015, to have had 6–9% (point estimate 7.3%) Neanderthal DNA, indicating a Neanderthal ancestor up to four to six generations earlier, but this hybrid population does not appear to have made a substantial contribution to the genomes of later Europeans. In 2016, the DNA of Neanderthals from Denisova Cave revealed evidence of interbreeding 100,000 years ago, and interbreeding with an earlier dispersal of H. sapiens may have occurred as early as 120,000 years ago in places such as the Levant. The earliest H. sapiens remains outside of Africa occur at Misliya Cave 194–177,000 years ago, and Skhul and Qafzeh 120–90,000 years ago. The Qafzeh humans lived at approximately the same time as the Neanderthals from the nearby Tabun Cave. The Neanderthals of the German Hohlenstein-Stadel have deeply divergent mtDNA compared to more recent Neanderthals, possibly due to introgression of human mtDNA between 316,000 and 219,000 years ago, or simply because they were genetically isolated. Whatever the case, these first interbreeding events have not left any trace in modern human genomes.

=== Interbreeding with Denisovans ===
Chris Stringer's Homo family tree. The horizontal axis represents geographic location, and the vertical time in millions of years ago. (Note: Homo floresiensis originated in an unknown location from unknown ancestors and reached remote parts of Indonesia. Homo erectus spread from Africa to western Asia, then east Asia and Indonesia; its presence in Europe is uncertain, but it gave rise to Homo antecessor, found in Spain. Homo heidelbergensis originated from Homo erectus in an unknown location and dispersed across Africa, southern Asia and southern Europe (other scientists interpret fossils, here named heidelbergensis, as late erectus). Modern humans spread from Africa to western Asia and then to Europe and southern Asia, eventually reaching Australia and the Americas. In addition to Neanderthals and Denisovans, a third gene flow of archaic Africa origin is indicated at the right. The chart is missing superarchaic (which diverged from erectus 1.9 mya) introgression into Neanderthal/Denisovan common ancestor.)

Based on nuclear DNA (nDNA), Neanderthals and Denisovans share a more recent last common ancestor (LCA) than to modern humans. However, Neanderthals and modern humans share a more recent mitochondrial LCA (observable by studying mtDNA) and Y chromosome LCA. This likely resulted from an interbreeding event subsequent to the Neanderthal/Denisovan split. This involved either introgression coming from an unknown archaic human into Denisovans, or introgression from an earlier unidentified modern human wave from Africa into Neanderthals. Several Neanderthal-like fossils in Eurasia from a similar time period are often grouped into H. heidelbergensis, of which some may be relict populations of earlier humans, which could have interbred with Denisovans. This is also used to explain an approximately 124,000-year-old German Neanderthal specimen with mtDNA that diverged from other Neanderthals (except for Sima de los Huesos) about 270,000 years ago, while its genomic DNA indicated divergence less than 150,000 years ago.

Sequencing of the genome of a Denisovan from Denisova Cave has shown that 17% of its genome derives from Neanderthals. This Neanderthal DNA more closely resembled that of a 120,000-year-old Neanderthal bone from the same cave than that of Neanderthals from Vindija Cave, Croatia, or Mezmaiskaya Cave in the Caucasus, suggesting that interbreeding was local.

For the 90,000-year-old Denisova 11, it was found that her father was a Denisovan related to more recent inhabitants of the region, and her mother a Neanderthal related to more recent European Neanderthals at Vindija Cave, Croatia. Given how few Denisovan bones are known, the discovery of a first-generation hybrid indicates interbreeding was very common between these species, and Neanderthal migration across Eurasia likely occurred sometime after 120,000 years ago.

== See also ==
- Human evolutionary genetics
- Recent human evolution
- Accretion model of Neanderthal origins

== Sources ==
- Reich, David (2018). "Encounters with Neanderthals". Who we are and how we got here: ancient DNA and the new science of the human past. Oxford University Press. ISBN 978-0-19-882125-0.
