= Heiney =

Heiney is a surname. Notable people with the surname include:

- Donald Heiney (1921–1993), American sailor, academic, and writer
- Paul A. Heiney, American physicist
- Paul Heiney (born 1949), English television presenter

== See also ==
- Hiney (surname)
