= Neanderthal =

Neanderthal Temporal range: Middle–Late Pleistocene 0.24–0.04 Ma
- An approximate reconstruction of a Neanderthal skeleton in the American Museum of Natural History. The central rib-cage (including the sternum) and parts of the pelvis are from modern humans.

Scientific classification
- Kingdom: Animalia
- Phylum: Chordata
- Class: Mammalia
- Order: Primates
- Superfamily: Hominoidea
- Family: Hominidae
- Genus: Homo
- Species: †H. neanderthalensis

Binomial name
- †Homo neanderthalensis King, 1864

Synonyms
- Homo: H. stupidus Haeckel, 1895; H. europaeus primigenius Wilser, 1898; H. primigenius Schwalbe, 1906; H. antiquus Adloff, 1908; H. transprimigenius mousteriensis Farrer, 1908; H. mousteriensis hauseri Klaatsch 1909; H. priscus Krause, 1909; H. chapellensis von Buttel-Reepen, 1911; H. calpicus Keith, 1911; H. acheulensis moustieri Wiegers, 1915; H. lemousteriensis Wiegers, 1915; H. naulettensis Baudouin, 1916; H. sapiens neanderthalensis Kleinshmidt, 1922; H. heringsdorfensis Werthe, 1928; H. galilensis Joleaud, 1931; H. primigenius galilaeensis Sklerj, 1937; H. kiikobiensis Bontsch-Osmolovskii, 1940; H. sapiens krapinensis Campbell, 1962; H. erectus mapaensis Kurth, 1965; Palaeoanthropus: P. neanderthalensis McCown and Keith, 1939; P. heidelbergensis McCown and Keith, 1939; P. ehringsdorfensis Paterson, 1940; P. krapinensis Sergi, 1911; P. palestinensis McCown and Keith, 1939; P. europaeus Sergi, 1910; Protanthropus: P. atavus Haeckel, 1895; P. tabunensis Bonarelli, 1944; Acanthropus: A. neanderthalensis Arldt, 1915; A. primigenius Abel, 1920; A. neanderthalensis Dawkins, 1926

Extinct species of human

Neanderthal (/niˈændərˌtɑːl, neɪ-, -ˌθɑːl/ nee-AN-də(r)-TAHL, nay-, -THAHL; Homo neanderthalensis or sometimes Homo sapiens neanderthalensis) is an extinct species of archaic human which inhabited Europe and Western and Central Asia during the Middle to Late Pleistocene. The timeline of Neanderthal extinction is uncertain, but generally considered to be complete in Asia and most of Europe by 40,000 years ago, perhaps because early modern humans came to Europe. Neanderthals seem to have survived longer in peninsulas and other more isolated regions, namely the Iberian Peninsula.

The first recognised Neanderthal fossil, Neanderthal 1, was discovered in 1856 in the Neander Valley, Germany. At first, Neanderthal 1 was considered to be one of the lower races in accord with historical race concepts. As more fossils were discovered through the early 20th century, Neanderthals were characterised as a unique species of underdeveloped human, in particular by Marcellin Boule. By the mid-twentieth century, it was believed that human evolution progressed from an ape-like ancestor through a "Neanderthal phase" to modern humans. This gave way to monogenism (that all living humans descend from a fully anatomically modern ancestor) and the "Out of Africa" theory in the 1970s. In 2010, the sequencing of the Neanderthal genome from ancient DNA validated that Neanderthals interbred with modern humans.

Neanderthal anatomy is characterised by a long and low skull, a heavy and rounded brow ridge (supraorbital torus), an occipital bun (bony projection) at the back of the skull, strong teeth and jaws, a wide chest, and short limbs. These traits gradually became more frequent through the Middle Pleistocene of Europe, possibly due to natural selection in the cold climate, as well as genetic drift when populations collapsed during glacial periods. Specimens vary in height from 147.5 to 177 cm (4 ft 10 in to 5 ft 10 in), with an average male estimated at 165 cm (5 ft 5 in) and weighing 75 kg (165 lb). While Neanderthal brain volume and ratio to body size averaged higher than any living human population—1,640 cc (100 cu in) for males and 1,460 cc (89 cu in) for females—their brain organisation differed from modern humans in areas related to cognition and language, which could explain the comparative simplicity of Neanderthal behaviour to Cro-Magnons in the archaeological record.

Neanderthals made Mousterian stone tools (a Middle Palaeolithic industry) and possibly wore blankets and ponchos. They maintained and might have created fire. They predominantly ate whatever was abundant close to home, usually big game as well as plants and mushrooms. Neanderthals were frequently victims of major physical traumas and animal attacks. Examples of Palaeolithic art have been inconclusively attributed to Neanderthals, namely possible ornaments made from bird claws and feathers; collections of unusual objects including crystals and fossils; and engravings. Neanderthals buried their dead, but there is no clear indication that they believed in life after death.

== Etymology ==
Neanderthals are named after the Neander Valley in which the first identified specimen was found. The valley was spelled Neanderthal and the species was spelled Neanderthaler in German until the spelling reform of 1901. (Note: The German /t/ phoneme was frequently spelled th from the 15th to 19th centuries until the German Orthographic Conference of 1901. The German spelling Thal ("valley", a cognate of English dale) changed to Tal, and the h was also dropped from Neandertal for the valley and Neandertaler for the species.) The spelling Neandertal for the species is occasionally seen in English, even in scientific publications, but the scientific name, H. neanderthalensis, is always spelled with th according to the principle of priority. The vernacular name of the species in German is always Neandertaler ("inhabitant of the Neander Valley"), whereas Neandertal always refers to the valley. (Note: In Mettmann, "Neander Valley", there is a local idiosyncrasy in use of the outdated spellings with th, such as with the Neanderthal Museum (but the name is in English [German would require Neandertalermuseum]), the Neanderthal station (Bahnhof Neanderthal), and some other rare occasions meant for tourists. Beyond these, city convention is to use th when referring to the species.) The valley itself was named after the 17th-century German theologian and hymn writer Joachim Neander, who often visited the area. His grandfather, a musician, had changed the family name from the original German Neumann "new man" (cf. "Newman") to the Graeco-Roman form Neander (deriving with Greek ἀνήρ ănḗr "man"), following the fashion of the time.

The th in Neanderthal can be pronounced as /t/ (hence /niˈændərtɑːl/) following the German convention or Anglicized as fricative /θ/ (hence /niˈændərθɑːl/), as per the standard English pronunciation of th. Neanderthal 1, the type specimen, was known as the "Neanderthal cranium" or "Neanderthal skull" in anthropological literature, and the individual reconstructed on the basis of the skull was occasionally called "the Neanderthal man". In 1863, Irish geologist William King extended the name "Neanderthal man" from the individual specimen to the entire species.

== Taxonomy ==
=== Discovery ===
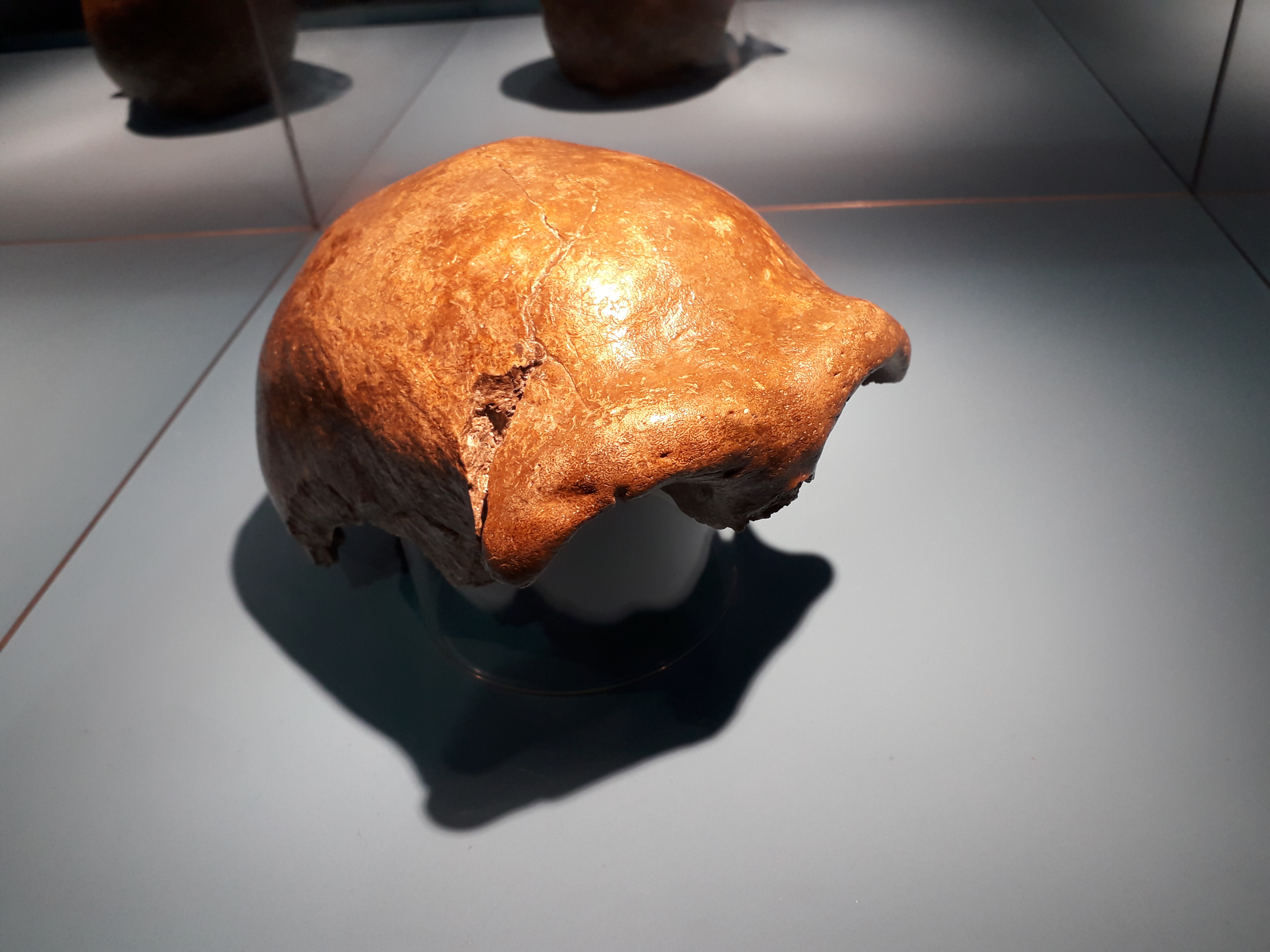
Skullcap of Neanderthal 1, the type specimen, at the Musée de l'Homme, Paris

A number of fossilized Neanderthal remains were discovered prior to the modern understanding of their taxonomy. The earliest known—Engis 2 (a skull)—was discovered in 1829 by the Belgian prehistorian Philippe-Charles Schmerling–often considered the founder of paleontology–in the Grottes d'Engis, Belgium. Schmerling described the remains as morphologically human but "poorly developed". In 1848, Gibraltar 1 from Forbes' Quarry was presented to the Gibraltar Scientific Society by then-Secretary Lieutenant Edmund Henry Réné Flint, but was classified as a modern human.

In 1856, local schoolteacher Johann Carl Fuhlrott recognised bones from Kleine Feldhofer Grotte in Neander Valley—Neanderthal 1—as distinct from modern humans, (Note: The bones were discovered by workers of Wilhelm Beckershoff and Friedrich Wilhelm Pieper. Initially, the workers threw the bones out as debris, but Beckershoff then told them to store the bones. Pieper asked Fuhlrott to come up to the cave and investigate the bones, which Beckershoff and Pieper believed belonged to a cave bear.) and gave them to German anthropologist Hermann Schaaffhausen to study in 1857. It comprised the cranium, thigh bones, right arm, left humerus and ulna, left ilium (hip bone), part of the right shoulder blade, and pieces of the ribs.

=== Research history ===
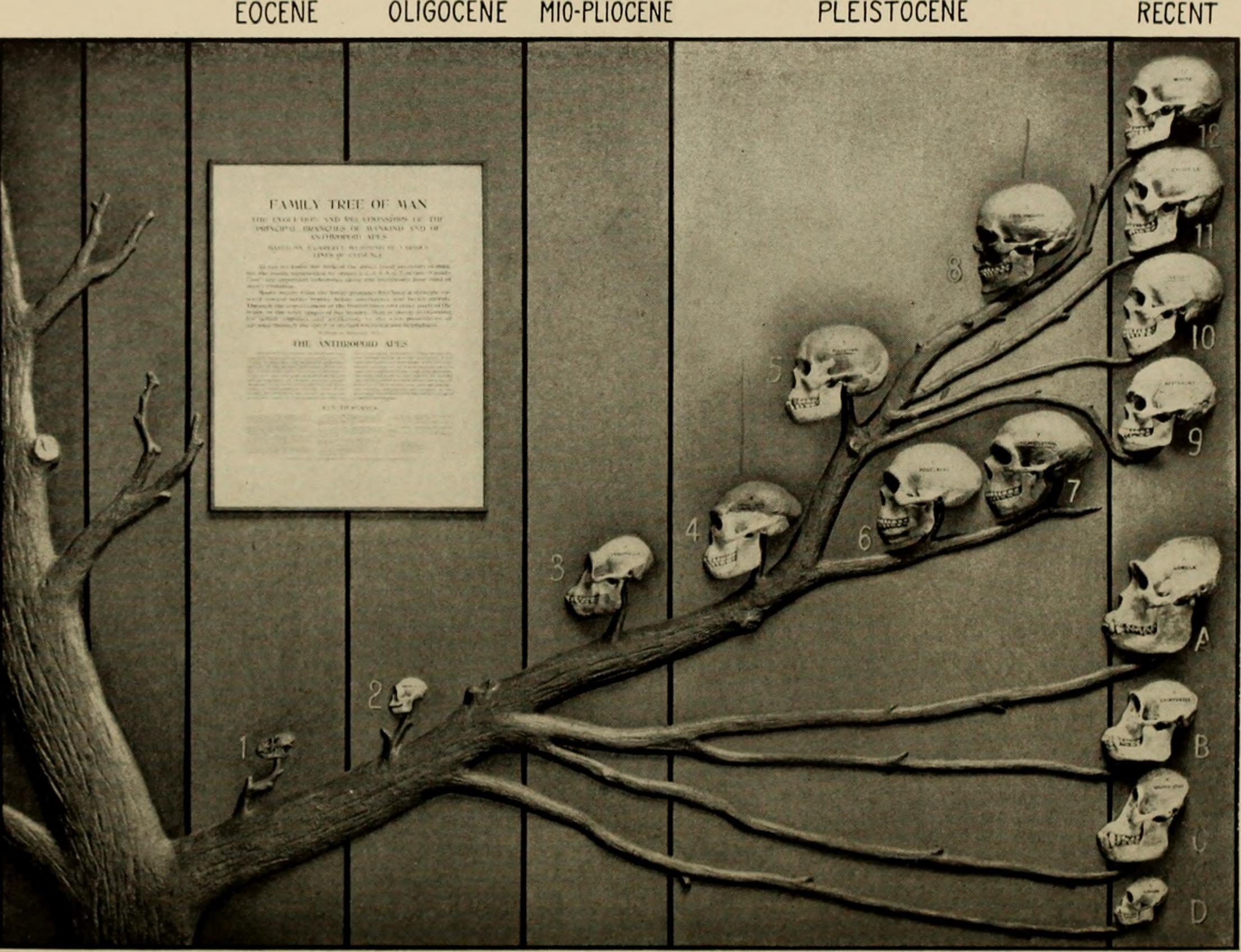
William K. Gregory's The Family Tree of Man exhibit at the American Museum of Natural History, 1924 1) Notharctus 2) Propliopithecus 3) Dryopithecus 4) Java Man 5) Piltdown Man 6) Heidelberg Man 7) Neanderthal Man 8) Cro-Magnon Man 9) Australian Black-fellow (pejorative term for Aboriginal Australians) 10) Hottentot (pejorative term for the Southern African Khoisan) 11) Chinese 12) American Caucasian

Following Charles Darwin's 1859 On the Origin of Species, Fuhlrott and Schaaffhausen argued that Neanderthal 1 represents a primitive lower human form, aligning more closely with non-human apes as well as Negroids, Eskimos, and Aboriginal Australians (which were variably classified as separate species or subspecies of human at the time). The binomial name Homo neanderthalensis was first proposed by William King in a paper read to the 33rd British Science Association in 1863, formally recognising it as distinct from modern humans. However, in 1864 he recommended that Neanderthals and modern humans be classified in different genera as he compared the Neanderthal braincase to that of a chimpanzee.

The uniqueness of Neanderthal Man met opposition namely from the pathologist Rudolf Virchow, who argued against defining new species based on only a single find. In 1872, Virchow erroneously interpreted Neanderthal characteristics as evidence of senility, disease, and malformation instead of archaicness, which stalled Neanderthal research until the end of the century. By the early 20th century, numerous other Neanderthal discoveries had been made, establishing H. neanderthalensis as a legitimate species. At first, many palaeontologists considered Neanderthals to be an intermediary phase between modern humans and more apelike ancestors, as suggested by German anatomist Gustav Albert Schwalbe. This hypothesis was opposed by French palaeontologist Marcellin Boule, who authored several publications starting in 1908 describing the French Neanderthal specimen La Chapelle-aux-Saints 1 ("The Old Man") as a slouching, ape-like creature distantly related to modern man. Boule's ideas would define discussions of Neanderthals for some time.

Boule suggested two different lineages existed in Ice Age Europe: a more evolved one descending from the British Piltdown Man (a hoax) to the French Grimaldi Man (a Cro-Magnon) which would culminate with modern Europeans; and a less evolved dead-end lineage leading from the German Heidelberg Man to Neanderthal Man. As the focus of human origins shifted from Europe to East Asia ("Out of Asia" hypothesis) by the 1930s and 40s with discoveries such as Java Man and Peking Man (as well as the marginalisation of Piltdown Man), the question of a "Neanderthal phase" in human evolution once again became a topic of discussion. The definition of "Neanderthal" expanded to include several anatomically variable specimens around the Old World. In the contextual debate between monogenism and polycentrism, some specimens were described as "progressive" Neanderthals which would evolve into some local subspecies of H. sapiens (polycentricism), while the "classic" Neanderthals of the Western European Würm glaciation would not.

In the 1970s, with the formulation of cladistics and the consequent refinement of the anatomical definitions of species, this "global morphological pattern" fell apart. The "Neanderthaloids" of Africa and East Asia were reclassified as distant relatives to H. neanderthalensis. At around the same time, the "Out of Asia" hypothesis was overturned by the "Out of Africa" hypothesis, which posited that all modern humans share a fully modern common ancestor (monogenism). There were two main schools of thought: modern humans competitively replaced all other archaic humans ("Replacement"), or extensively interbred with them while dispersing throughout the world ("Regional Continuity"). In 2010, the first mapping of the Neanderthal genome demonstrated that there was at least some interbreeding between archaic and modern humans. Subsequent genetic studies continue to raise questions on how Neanderthals should be classified relative to modern humans.

=== Classification ===
Neanderthals can be classified as a unique species as H. neanderthalensis, though some authors argue expanding the definition of H. sapiens to include other ancient humans, with combinations such as H. sapiens neanderthalensis. The latter opinion has generally been justified using Neanderthal genetics, as well as inferences on the complexity of Neanderthal behaviour based on the archaeological record. While there seems to have been some genetic contact between these two groups, there are potential indicators of hybrid incompatibility, (Note: The X-chromosome carries far less archaic DNA than any autosome, which has either been explained as hybrid incompatibility (the large-X effect — background selection) or male sex bias (hybrids were normally the children of a male Neanderthal and female modern human).) which if true could justify species distinction. The crux of the issue lies in the vagueness of the term "species" (the species problem).

Among identified archaic humans, Neanderthals are most closely related to Denisovans based on nuclear DNA (nDNA) analyses. Denisovans are an enigmatic group of Late Pleistocene humans only recognisable by a genetic signature rather than anatomical landmarks. Likely due to more recent interbreeding episodes, the mitochondrial DNA (mtDNA, passed down maternally) and Y-chromosome DNA (passed down paternally) are more similar between Neanderthals and modern humans than between Neanderthals and Denisovans. Similarly, 430,000 year old fossils from the Sima de los Huesos are more closely related to Neanderthals in their nDNA, but their mtDNA aligns more closely with Denisovans.

A 2021 phylogeny of some Middle Pleistocene and Neanderthal fossils using tip dating:

- Homo
  - H. habilis
  - - H. erectus
    - - Tighennif
      - - - Saldanha
          - - - Petralona
              - Kabwe 1
            - - Ceprano
              - Bodo
        - - - Mauer 1
            - Arago
          - - - Narmada
              - Maba
            - - Ndutu
              - - Neanderthal branch
                  - Sima de los Huesos
                  - - Saccopastore
                    - - - - Tabun
                          - Gibraltar 1
                        - - Spy
                          - Neanderthal 1
                      - - - Amud 1
                          - Saint-Césaire
                        - - Shanidar
                          - - La Chapelle-aux-Saints 1
                            - La Ferrassie 1
                - H. sapiens

=== Evolution ===
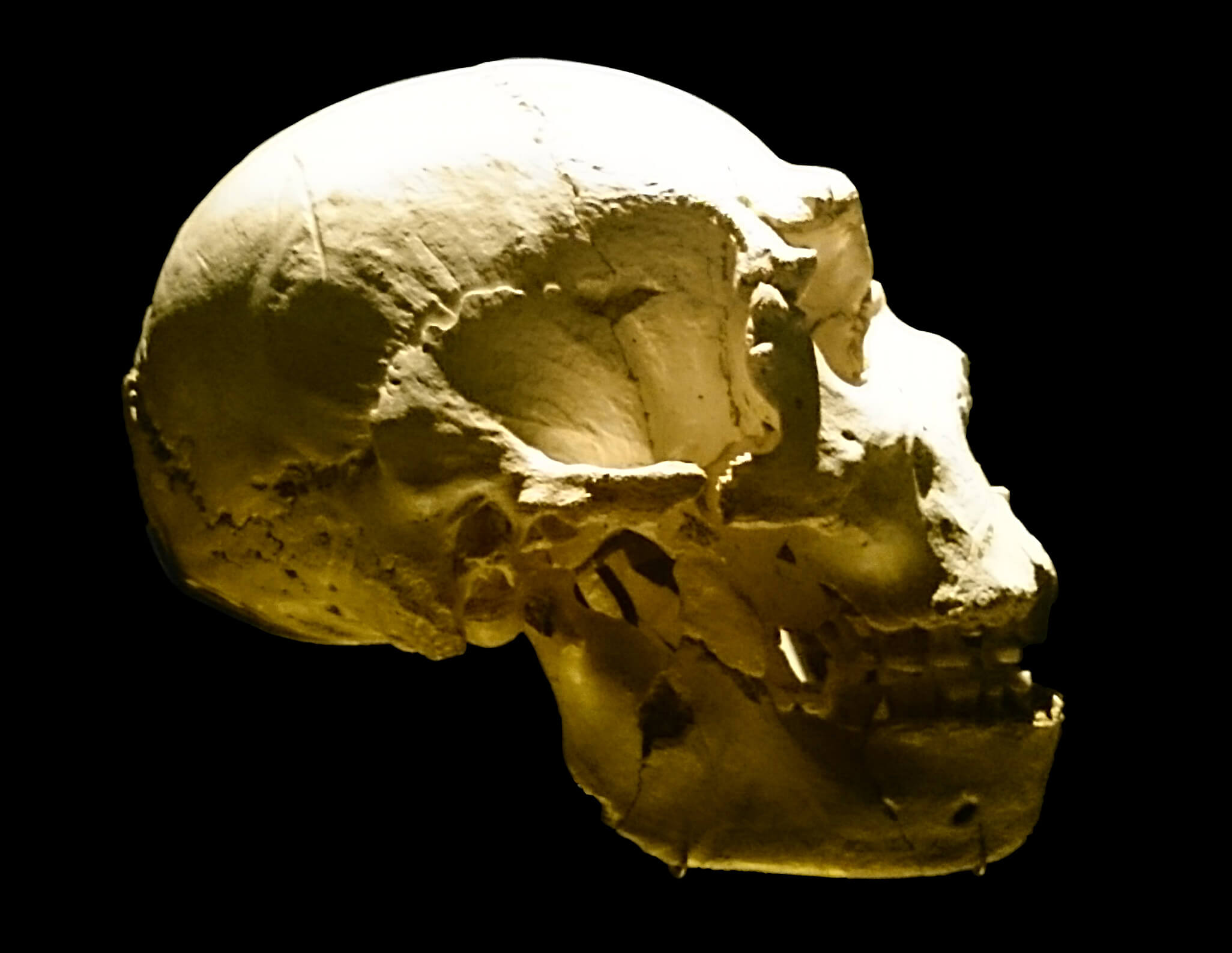
A "pre-Neanderthal" skull ("Miguelón") from Sima de los Huesos, Spain

Typical Neanderthal skull traits appear in the European fossil record near the beginning of the Middle Pleistocene, in specimens usually classified as H. heidelbergensis. These "pre-Neanderthals" seem to have gradually accreted these traits ("Neanderthalization") as populations adapted to the cold environment, evolving a "hyper-arctic" physique. Circumpolar peoples (namely Inuit groups) are often used as modern Neanderthal analogues to study "hyper-arctic" adaptations. Additionally, glacial periods may have forced populations into small refugia, reducing genetic diversity, leading to the development of other typical Neanderthal traits through genetic drift. The 120,000 to 140,000-year-old Israeli Nesher Ramla remains may represent one such source population which would recolonise Europe following the Penultimate Glacial Period.

The occurrence of typical Neanderthal traits in the Middle Pleistocene was highly variable even among individuals of the same population. The speed of Neanderthalization may have also been impeded by gene flow between Western Europe and Africa; this is exemplified by anomalous specimens which lack typical Neanderthal traits, such as Ceprano Man. The first recognisable early Neanderthals show up in the fossil record by the end of Marine Isotope Stage 7 (beginning roughly 243,000 years ago) and give way to late Neanderthals by the end of Marine Isotope Stage 5e. This spans the Penultimate Glacial Period to the Last Interglacial. Some early Neanderthal teeth from Payré, France, potentially date to MIS 8, but the dating is uncertain.

Genetic data usually estimates that Neanderthals diverged from modern humans sometime during the early Middle Pleistocene. Neanderthals and Denisovans are more closely related to each other than they are to modern humans, meaning the Neanderthal/Denisovan split occurred sometime later. Before splitting, Neanderthal/Denisovans (or "Neandersovans") migrating out of Africa into Europe apparently interbred with an unidentified "superarchaic" human species who were already present there; these superarchaics were the descendants of a very early migration out of Africa around 1.9 million years ago. Genetic data indicates that Neanderthals, at least after 100,000 years ago, maintained a small population with low genetic diversity, weakening natural selection and proliferating harmful mutations. It is unclear how long European populations suffered this population stress, or to what extent it influenced Neanderthalization.

=== Genome ===
The first Neanderthal genome sequence was published in 2010, and strongly indicated interbreeding between Neanderthals and early modern humans. This was based on three specimens in Vindija Cave, Croatia, which contained almost 4% archaic DNA (allowing for near complete sequencing of the genome). However, there was approximately 1 error for every 200 letters (base pairs) based on the implausibly high mutation rate, probably due to the preservation of the sample. In 2012, British-American geneticist Graham Coop hypothesised that they instead found evidence of a different archaic human species interbreeding with modern humans, which was disproven in 2013 by the sequencing of a high-quality Neanderthal genome preserved in a 50,000 year old toe (phalanx) bone from Denisova Cave, Siberia.

Chris Stringer's Homo family tree. The horizontal axis represents geographic location, and the vertical time in millions of years ago. (Note: Homo floresiensis originated in an unknown location from unknown ancestors and reached remote parts of Indonesia. Homo erectus spread from Africa to western Asia, then east Asia and Indonesia; its presence in Europe is uncertain, but it gave rise to Homo antecessor, found in Spain. Homo heidelbergensis originated from Homo erectus in an unknown location and dispersed across Africa, southern Asia and southern Europe (other scientists interpret fossils, here named heidelbergensis, as late erectus). Modern humans spread from Africa to western Asia and then to Europe and southern Asia, eventually reaching Australia and the Americas. In addition to Neanderthals and Denisovans, a third gene flow of archaic Africa origin is indicated at the right.)

Based on nuclear DNA (nDNA), Neanderthals and Denisovans share a more recent last common ancestor (LCA) than to modern humans. However, Neanderthals and modern humans share a more recent mitochondrial LCA (observable by studying mtDNA) and Y chromosome LCA. This likely resulted from an interbreeding event subsequent to the Neanderthal/Denisovan split. This involved either introgression coming from an unknown archaic human into Denisovans, or introgression from an earlier unidentified modern human wave from Africa into Neanderthals. Several Neanderthal-like fossils in Eurasia from a similar time period are often grouped into H. heidelbergensis, of which some may be relict populations of earlier humans, which could have interbred with Denisovans. This is also used to explain an approximately 124,000-year-old German Neanderthal specimen with mtDNA that diverged from other Neanderthals (except for Sima de los Huesos) about 270,000 years ago, while its genomic DNA indicated divergence less than 150,000 years ago.

== Demographics ==
=== Range ===
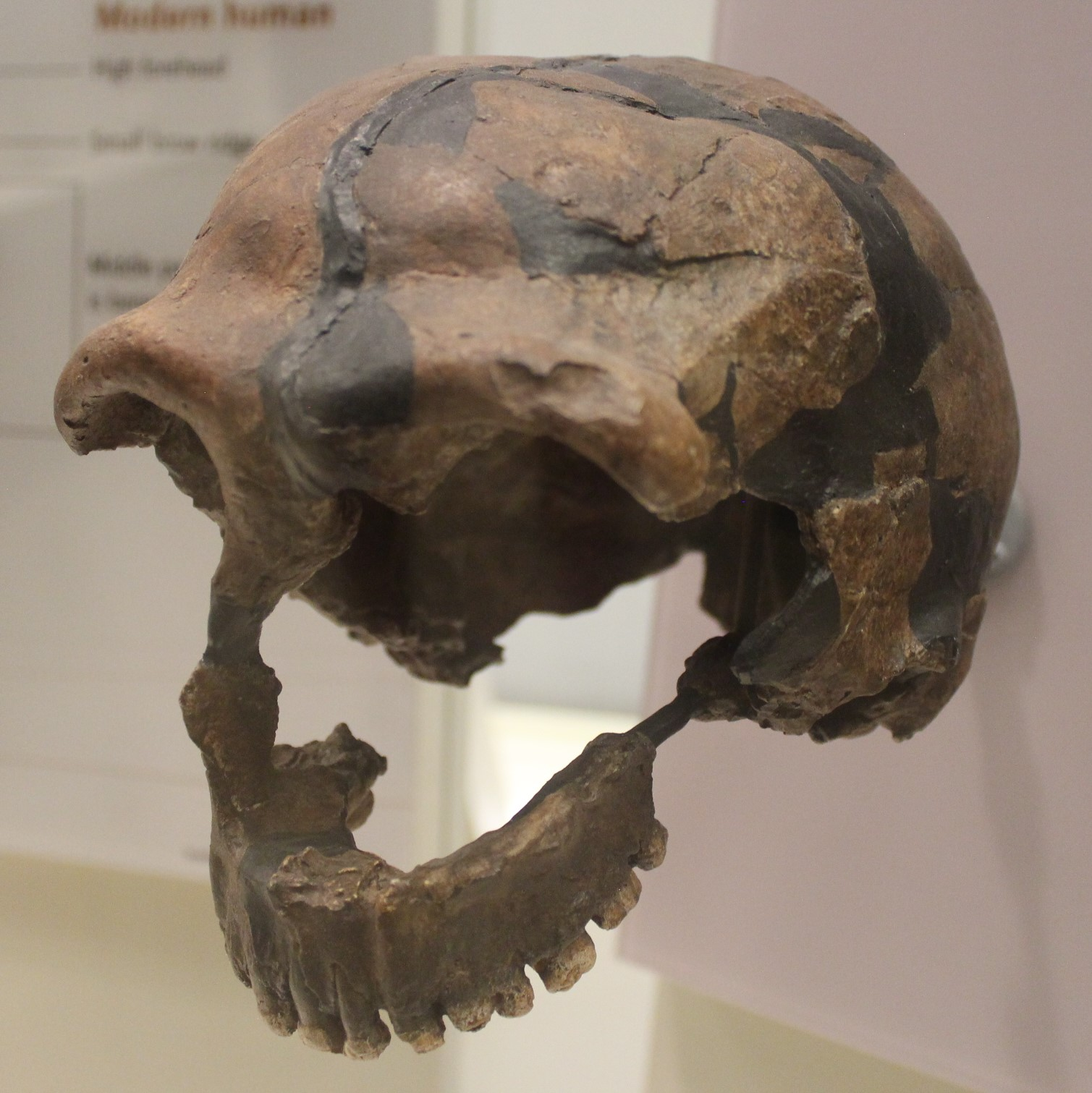
Neanderthal skull from Tabun Cave, Israel, at the Israel Museum

The Neanderthals were the first human species to permanently occupy Europe. While pre-Neanderthals are mostly identified around Western Europe, classic Neanderthals are recorded across Europe as well as Southwest and Central Asia, up to the Altai Mountains in southern Siberia. Pre- and early Neanderthals seem to have continuously occupied only France, Spain, and Italy, although some appear to have moved out of this "core-area" to form temporary settlements eastward (without leaving Europe). Nonetheless, southwestern France has the highest density of sites for pre- and classic Neanderthals.

The southernmost find was recorded at Shuqba Cave, Palestine; reports of Neanderthals from the North African Jebel Irhoud and Haua Fteah have been reidentified as H. sapiens. Their easternmost presence is recorded at Denisova Cave, Siberia 85°E; the southeast Chinese Maba Man, a skull, shares several physical attributes with Neanderthals, although these may be the result of convergent evolution rather than Neanderthals extending their range to the Pacific Ocean. The northernmost bound is generally accepted to have been 55°N, with unambiguous sites known between 50–53°N, but this is difficult to assess because glacial advances destroy most human remains. Middle Palaeolithic artefacts have been found up to 60°N on the Russian plains, but these are more likely from modern humans.

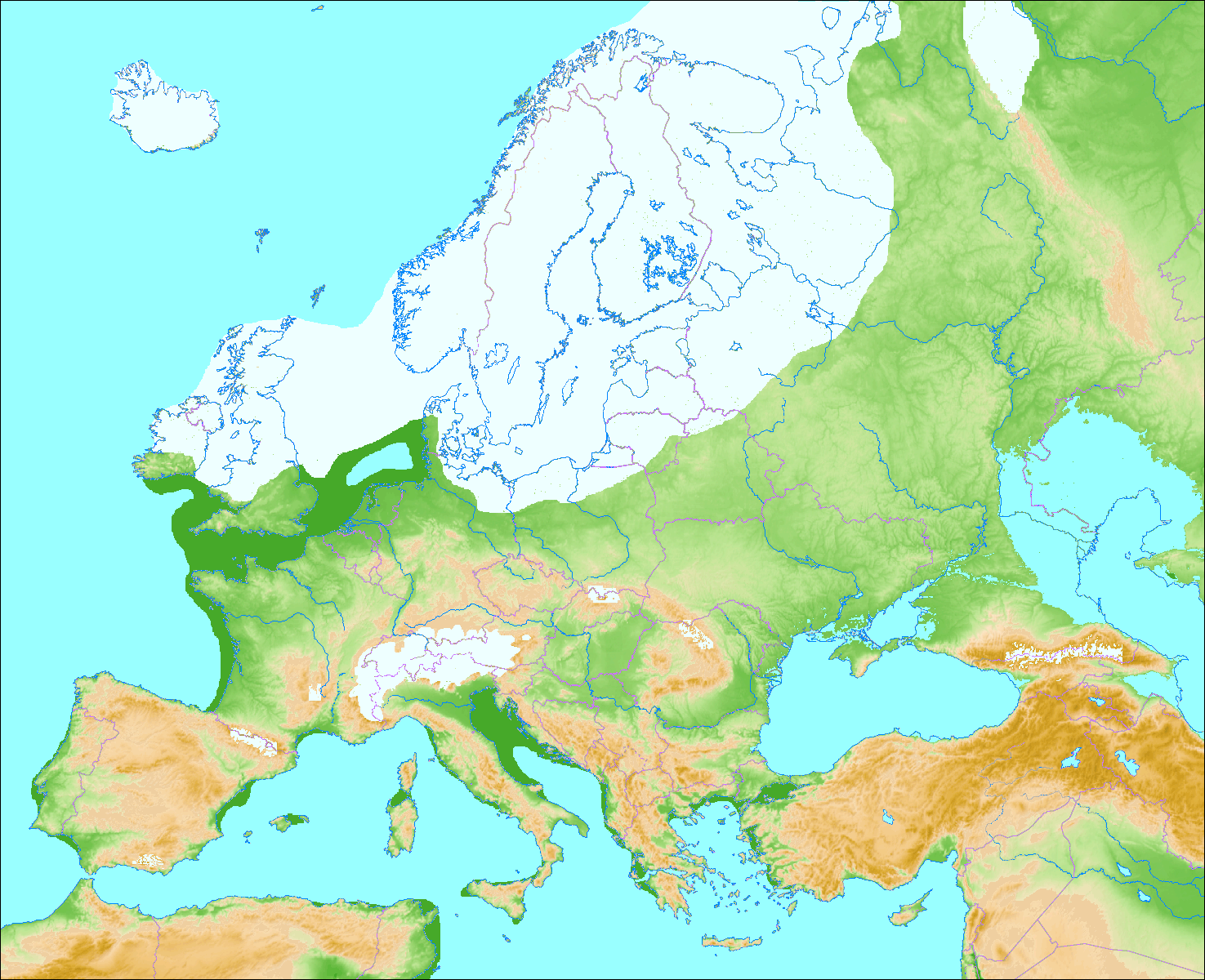
Europe 20,000 to 70,000 years ago during the Würm glaciation

It is possible Neanderthal range expanded and contracted as the ice retreated and grew, respectively, to avoid permafrost areas, residing in certain refuge zones during glacial maxima. Stable environments with mild mean annual temperatures may have been the most suitable Neanderthal habitats.

=== Population ===
Like modern humans, Neanderthals probably descended from a very small population with an effective population—the number of individuals who can bear or father children—of 3,000 to 12,000 approximately. Neanderthals maintained this low population, proliferating weakly harmful genes due to the reduced effectivity of natural selection. Archaeological evidence suggests that the initial Cro-Magnon population was approximately 10 times higher than Neanderthals. Archaeogenetic evidence indicates that late Neanderthals, the Neanderthal population that encountered modern humans in Europe, descended from a population originating in southwestern France about 65,000 years ago before dispersing across Europe.

Compared to Cro-Magnons, Neanderthals may have been at a demographic disadvantage due to a lower fertility rate, a higher infant mortality rate, or a combination of the two. In a sample of 206 Neanderthals, based on the abundance of young and mature adults in comparison to other age demographics, about 80% of them above the age of 20 died before reaching 40. This high mortality rate was probably due to their high-stress environment. Infant mortality was estimated to have been very high for Neanderthals, about 43% in northern Eurasia.

=== Life history ===
Neanderthal brain size at birth was similar to modern humans and constrained by the same obstetric factors; mothers giving birth to infants with heads too large to pass through the birth canal would be selected against. Growth in brain volume occurred at a faster pace in Neanderthal infants than in modern human infants, but growth of the brain did not reach completion earlier in Neanderthals than in modern humans owing to the larger brain size of the former.

Though tooth crown development in Neanderthals was slower than earlier hominins, it was not as prolonged as in modern humans, suggesting a faster life history in the former species. Examination of dentition shows that anterior tooth crown formation occurred very rapidly in Neanderthals relative to both modern humans and earlier Homo species. In particular, the accelerated rate of incisor crown formation in Neanderthals is indicative of a general accelerated pattern of life history and cerebral development when compared to comparable measurements in modern humans.

Estimates of the age at weaning of Neanderthals vary. Barium levels in the enamel of a Belgian Neanderthal tooth from Scladina suggest a weaning age of 1.2 years. Trace element analysis of a Neanderthal tooth from Payré suggests that weaning occurred at about 2.5 years of age.

Locations of Neanderthal finds in Europe and the Levant.
View references
Locations of Neanderthal finds in Eurasia (note, part of Spain is cut off)
View references

== Anatomy ==
=== Skull ===
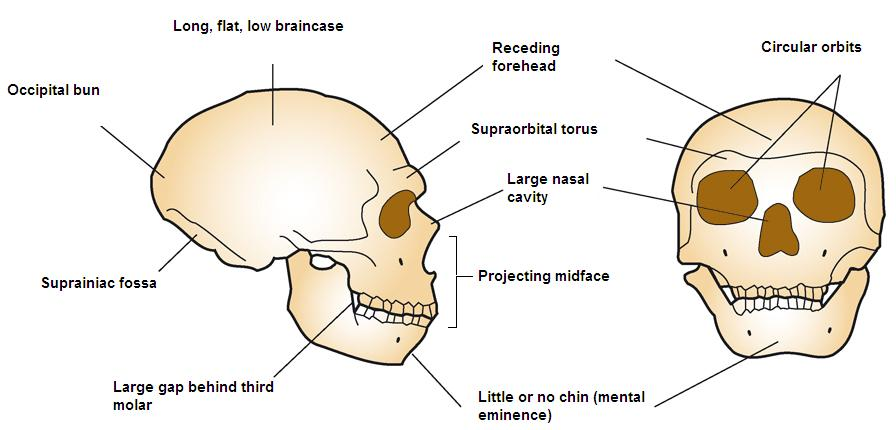
Neanderthal skull features

The Neanderthal skull has a flat and broad skullcap, rounded supraorbital torus (the bulge that forms the brow ridges), larger, wide orbits (eye sockets), a broad nose, mid-facial prognathism (the face projects far from the base of the skull), an "en bombe" (bomb-like) skull shape when viewed from the back, a fossa (depression) on the back of the skull below the level of the inion (suprainiac fossa), and an occipital bun (bony projection) at the back of the skull. Like those of other archaic humans, their jaws lack a true chin.

The Neanderthal braincase averages 1,640 cm^{3} (100 cu in) for males and 1,460 cm^{3} (89 cu in) for females, which is significantly larger than the averages for all 147 homonids studied. The largest Neanderthal brain, Amud 1, was calculated to be 1,736 cm^{3} (105.9 cu in), one of the largest ever recorded in humans. Neanderthal brain organisation differs in areas related to cognition and language, which may be implicated in the comparative simplicity of Neanderthal behaviour to Cro-Magnons in the archaeological record.

Neanderthals had large and wide noses, probably an adaptation to warm greater quantities of cold air to fuel their assumed heightened metabolism and activity levels. A large nose does not necessarily equate to a better sense of smell, and neurologically, because the olfactory bulbs are smaller, Neanderthals may have had a poorer sense of smell and olfactory memory than modern humans. The cheek bones are strong, the incisors are large and shovel-shaped, the molars have a swollen tooth pulp (taurodontism), and there is a gap behind the molars (retromolar space). These dental traits are usually interpreted as a response to habitual heavy loading of the front teeth, either to process mechanically challenging or attritive foods, or because Neanderthals regularly used the mouth as a third hand.

=== Build ===
In a sample of 45 Neanderthal long bones of presumably 14 men and 7 women, men averaged 164–168 cm (5 ft 5 in – 5 ft 6 in) and women 152–156 cm (5 ft 0 in – 5 ft 1 in), and the average male body mass index (BMI) of this sample was 26.9–28.3. This BMI is comparable to 20th century Canadians and Americans. Neanderthal body size varied by location; West Asian Neanderthals are in general reconstructed as taller and heavier than European Neanderthals. Considering the full fossil record, Neanderthals may have varied from 147.5 to 177 cm (4 ft 10 in to 5 ft 10 in) in height. In comparison, in a sample of 20 male and 10 female contemporary modern humans the respective average is 176.2 cm (5 ft 9 in) and 162.9 cm (5 ft 4 in).

As in all archaic species, there is no evidence of sexual dimorphism in the Neanderthal pelvis; both males and females had large pelvic bones relative to their body size. The Neanderthal chest was deep and wide, with a proportionally expansive thoracic cavity, and possibly stronger lung performance, and much higher caloric demands. The limbs are proportionally short. The body plan has traditionally been explained as a "hyper-arctic" adaptation (Allen's rule). Neanderthals would also have been effective sprinters: stronger lungs, and shorter limbs would have boosted efficiency.

Neanderthal pigmentation genes in modern non-African people are associated with both lighter and darker skin tones, as well as lighter and darker hair colors, suggesting Neanderthals themselves may have had variable pigmentation. Variants associated with red hair have been found in some Neanderthals, but they do not appear to have been common. Neanderthal skin and hair pigmentation variants are under positive selection in non-Africans, unlike most other Neanderthal genes, suggesting that the adaptive value of lighter features was beneficial for modern humans in Eurasia, where there is significantly less sunlight than in Africa.

=== Pathology ===
Neanderthals suffered a high rate of traumatic injury, with an estimated 79–94% of specimens showing evidence of healed major trauma, of which 37–52% were severely injured, and 13–19% injured before reaching adulthood. One extreme example is Shanidar 1, who shows signs of an amputation of the right arm likely due to a nonunion after breaking a bone in adolescence, osteomyelitis (a bone infection) on the left clavicle, an abnormal gait, vision problems in the left eye, and possible hearing loss (perhaps swimmer's ear). The high trauma rate may be due to a dangerous hunting strategy or frequent animal attacks.

== Culture ==
=== Social structure ===
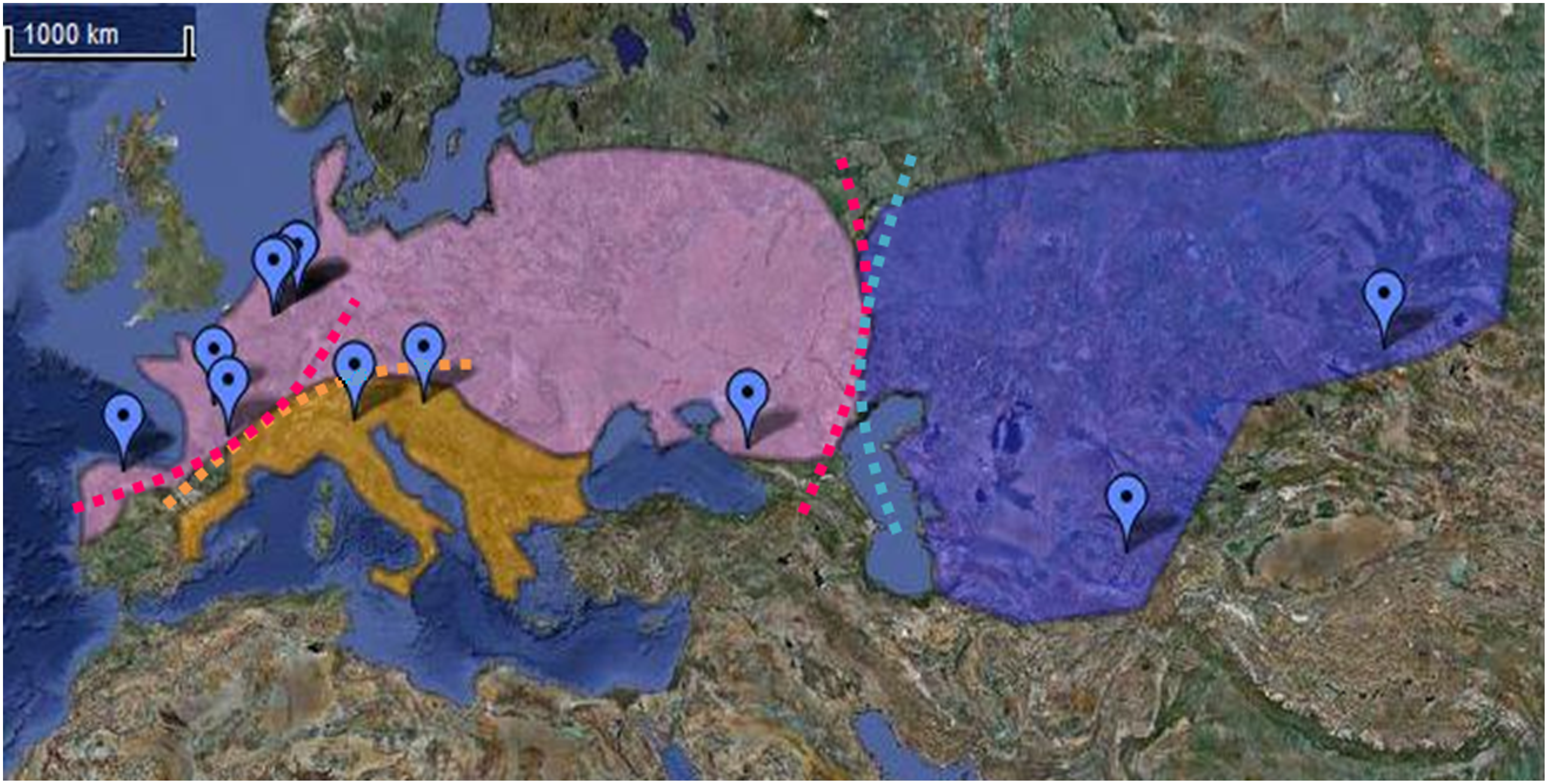
Genetically, Neanderthals may be grouped into three distinct regions (above), dots indicate sampled specimens.

It is difficult to infer Neanderthal group size, but indirect data generally suggests small bands of 10 to 30 individuals. Bands likely moved between certain caves depending on the season, indicated by remains of seasonal materials, such as certain foods. They returned to the same locations generation after generation and some sites may have been used for more than a century. Neanderthals may have been outcompeting cave bears for cave space. Intergroup movement may have been predominantly patrilocal (male relationships as the basis of groups with females from other groups entering for breeding).

Neanderthals maintained a low population across their range, which may have hindered their ability to maintain long-distance trade routes and to avoid inbreeding. Late Neanderthals may have regularly interacted with closely neighbouring communities within a region, but not so often beyond. Genetic analysis indicates there were at least three distinct geographical groups: Western Europe, the Mediterranean coast, and east of the Caucasus, with some migration among these regions.

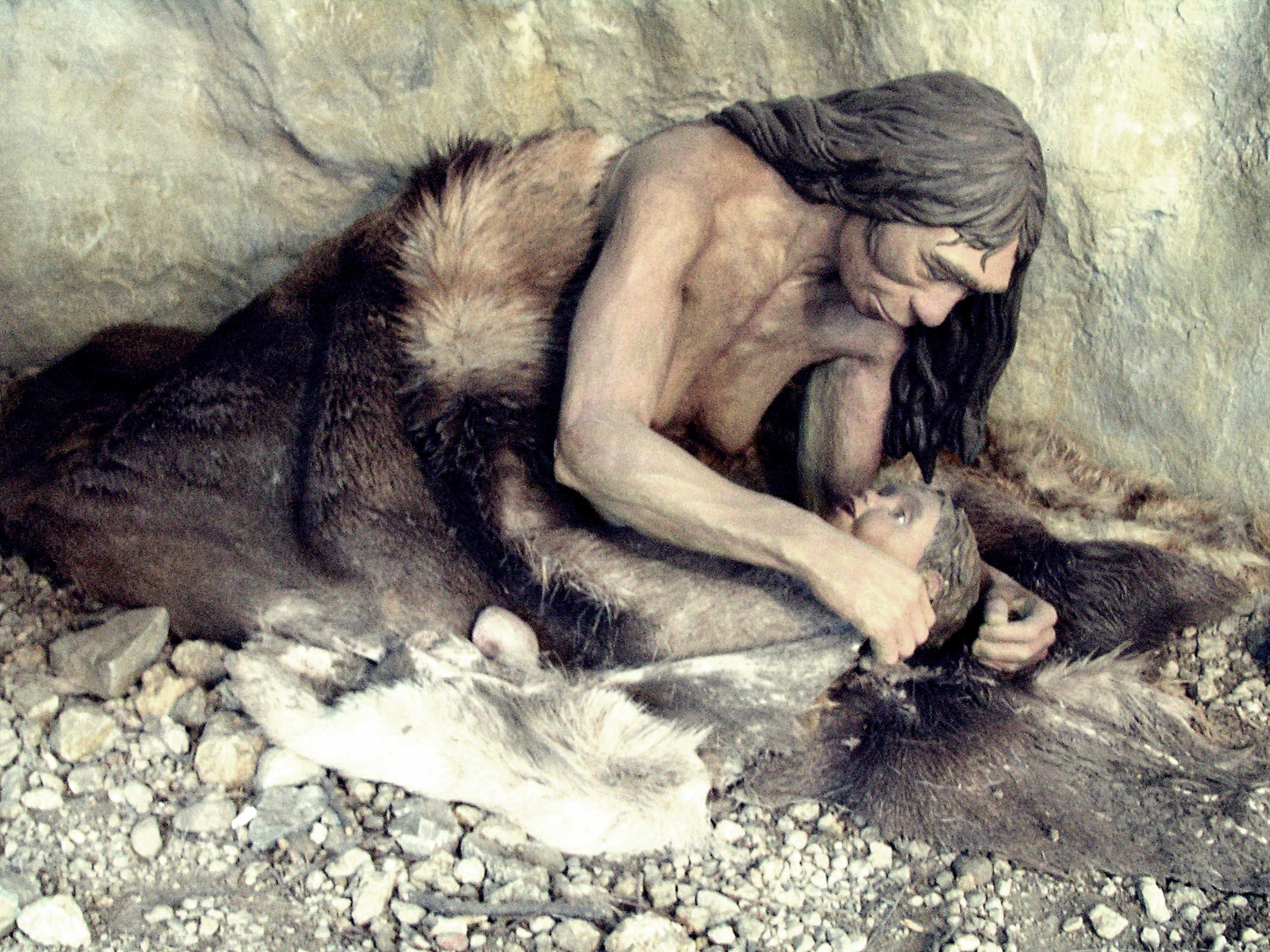
Neanderthal mother with child depicted in the Anthropos Pavilion of the Moravian Museum

While the Cro-Magnons are usually assumed to have generally practised sexual division of labour with men hunting and women gathering—like recent hunter-gatherer societies—it is unclear to what extent this may be applied to Neanderthals. Both Neanderthal men and women have similar traumatic injury patterns, which might imply that both sexes were involved in hunting. Dental wearing patterns among Neanderthals, on the other hand, could indicate men and women typically carried different items with their mouths, though these may not have been related to subsistence tasks. The women at Sidrón Cave, Spain, may have been eating more seeds and nuts than the men. The lack of distinctive task specialization in Neanderthals has usually been linked to their small population and group size, falling short of the demographic threshold where task specialization becomes feasible—which may also explain the comparative simplicity of Neanderthal material culture.

=== Food ===
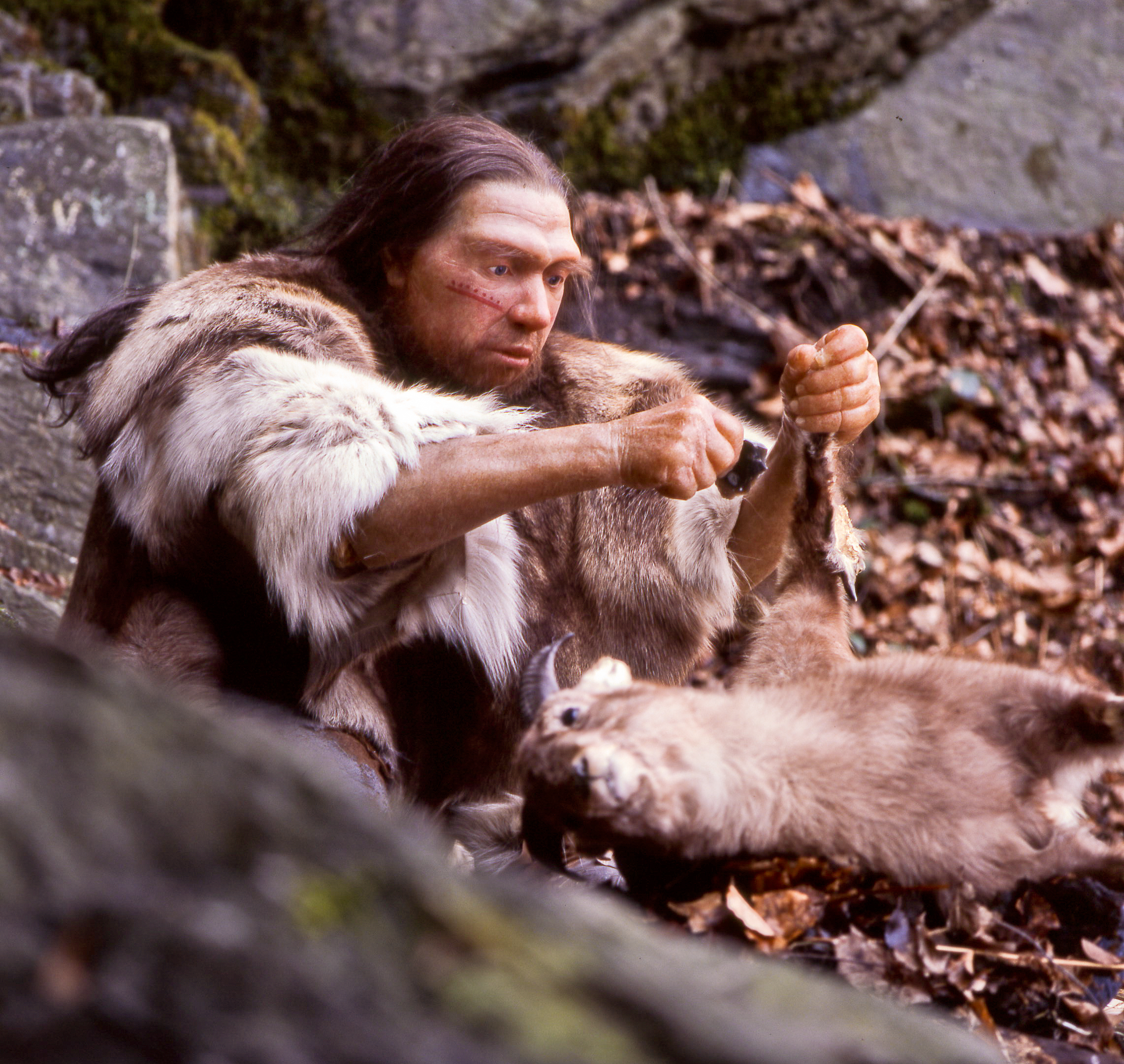
Reconstruction of a tattooed Neanderthal man butchering a goat at the Neanderthal Museum

Though once thought of as scavengers, Neanderthals are now considered apex predators. They appear to have eaten predominantly what was abundant within their immediate surroundings, consequently consuming across their range a wide array of meats and plants, the relative proportion of which varied substantially geographically. Cro-Magnons, in contrast, seem to have maintained a more diverse diet even in settings where certain foods would have been harder to procure; for example, Neanderthals living in forests ate about the same proportion of foodplants as Cro-Magnons, but Neanderthals on open steppe (where foodplants are harder to find) ate far less foodplants.

In many European sites, prey items include red deer, reindeer, horse, aurochs, ibex, and steppe bison. Neanderthals in Southwest Asia more commonly hunted mountain gazelle, Persian fallow deer, wild goat, and camels. They may have less frequently taken down larger Pleistocene megafauna whenever locally abundant, such as woolly mammoth and woolly rhinoceros. At the 125,000 year old Neumark-Nord site, Germany, there is evidence of regular hunting of straight-tusked elephants maybe every 5 to 6 years. Some waterside communities ate fish and shellfish—and at Vanguard Cave in Gibraltar, dolphin and Mediterranean monk seal. Neanderthals also hunted small game, and some caves show evidence of regular rabbit and tortoise consumption. At Gibraltar sites, there are butchered remains of 143 different bird species, many ground-dwelling such as the common quail, corn crake, woodlark, and crested lark. Neanderthals also consumed a variety of plants and mushrooms across their range—at Kebara Cave, Israel, over 50 species of seeds, nuts, fruits, and cereals.

Neanderthals possibly employed a wide range of food preparation techniques. At Cueva del Sidrón, Spain, Neanderthals may have roasted and smoked meat, and used certain plants—such as yarrow and camomile—for flavouring, although these plants may have instead been used for their medicinal properties. At Gorham's Cave, Gibraltar, Neanderthals may have been roasting pinecones to access pine nuts, and at Gruta da Figueira Brava, brown crabs to soften the shell before cracking them open. At Grotte du Lazaret, France, a total of twenty-three red deer, six ibexes, three aurochs, and one roe deer appear to have been hunted in a single autumn hunting season, when strong male and female deer herds would group together for rut. It is possible these Neanderthals were curing and storing all this meat before winter set in. Neanderthals at Neumark-Nord may have been rendering fat from animal bones to offset protein toxicity. Likewise, calcium measurements suggest that Neanderthals at Grotte du Bison frequently consumed bone.

Neanderthals competed with several large carnivores, but also seem to have hunted them down, namely cave lions and wolves, as well as cave and brown bear both in and out of hibernation. Neanderthals and other predators may have sometimes avoided competition by pursuing different prey, namely with cave hyenas and wolves (niche differentiation). Neanderthals, nonetheless, were frequently victims of animal attacks. There are multiple instances of Neanderthals practicing cannibalism, though it may have only been done in times of extreme food shortages, as in some cases in recorded human history.

=== The arts ===
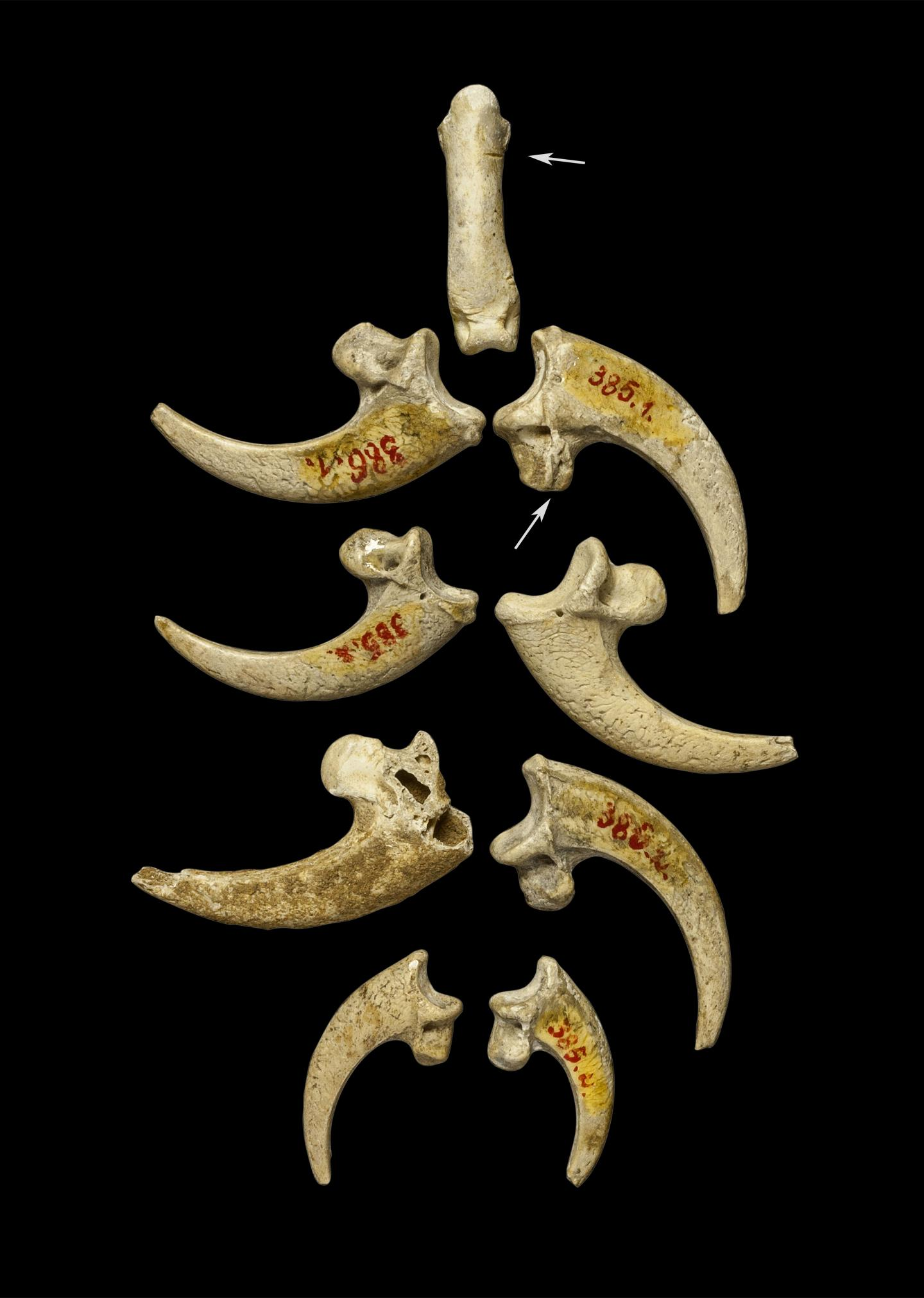
Speculative reconstruction of white-tailed eagle talon jewellery from Krapina, Croatia (arrows indicate cut marks)

Neanderthals collected non-functional, uniquely-shaped objects, namely shells, fossils, and gems. It is unclear if these objects were simply picked up for their aesthetic qualities, or if some symbolic significance was applied to them. Some shells may have been painted. Gibraltarian palaeoanthropologists Clive and Geraldine Finlayson suggested that Neanderthals used various bird parts as artistic media, especially black feathers. A 2020 study found evidence of a 3-ply cord fragment made from conifer inner-bark fibres at Abri du Maras, France, which can be used to knit light items, such as strings for hanging beads. 115,000-year-old perforated shell beads from Cueva Antón were possibly strung together to make a necklace.

There are several instances of nondescript engravings and scratches on flints, bones, pebbles, and stone slabs — as of 2014, 63 purported engravings have been reported from 27 different European and Middle Eastern Lower-to-Middle Palaeolithic sites. It is debated if these were made with symbolic intent. Neanderthals may have produced finger flutings on the walls of La Roche-Cotard over 57,000 years ago.

Neanderthals used ochre, a clay earth pigment. It is unclear if this constitutes evidence of artmaking because, while modern humans have used red ochre for decorative or symbolic colouration, they have also used ochre as medicine, hide tanning agent, food preservative, and insect repellent. The 43,000-year-old Divje Babe flute (a cave bear femur) from Slovenia has been attributed by some researchers to Neanderthals, though its status as a Palaeolithic flute is heavily disputed. Many researchers consider it to be most likely the product of a carnivorous animal chewing the bone.

=== Technology ===
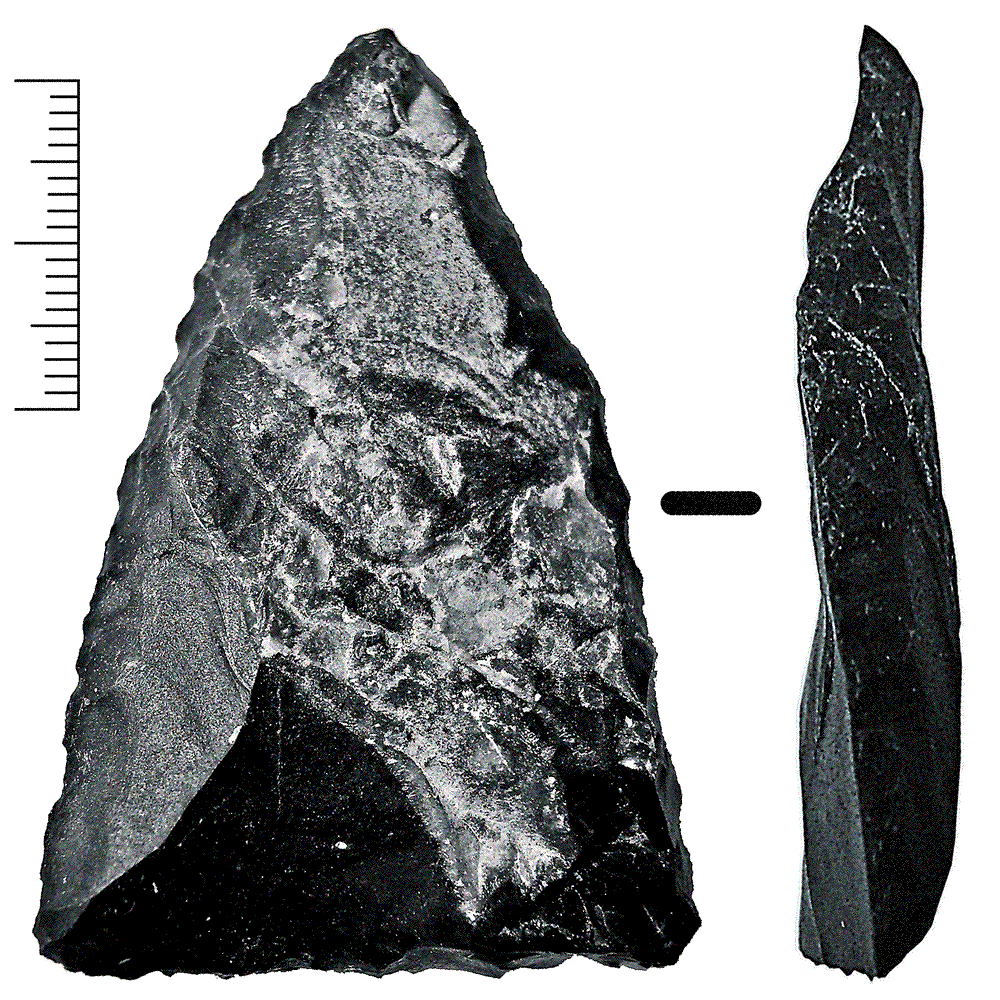
Mousterian point

Neanderthals manufactured Middle Palaeolithic stone tools, and are associated with the Mousterian industry, specifically the Levallois technique. After developing this technology from the Acheulean industry, there was a 150,000 year pause in Neanderthal stone tool innovation. Stalled technological growth may have followed from their low population, impeding complex ideas from being spread across their range or passed down generationally. Neanderthals normally collected raw materials from a source no more than 5 km (3.1 mi) away. Some communities were also making tools from shells and bone. They may have hafted tips onto spears using birch bark tar. European populations also manufactured wood spears, namely the 400,000 year old British Clacton Spear; 300,000 year old German Schöningen spears; and 120,000 year old German Lehringen Spear, including both likely thrown (Schöningen) and thrusting (Lehringen) types. It has been suggested that Neanderthals likely specifically selected particular wood types (such as European yew in the case of the Clacton and Lehringen spears) for manufacturing spears for their beneficial material properties.

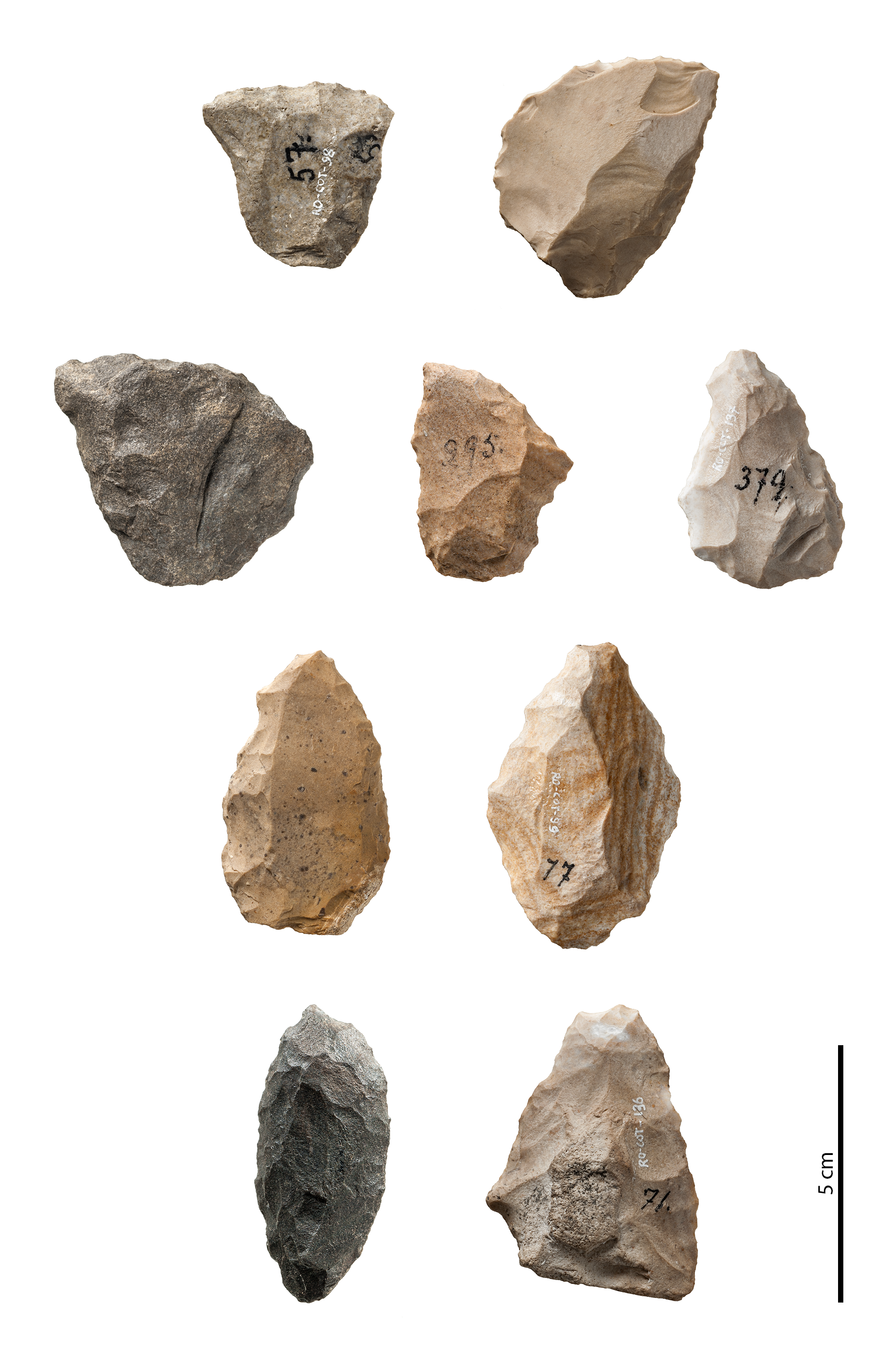
Neanderthal tools found in the Grotte de Cotencher.

Neanderthals invented the earliest dry distillation process to produce birch tar, a substance with adhesive and medicinal properties. A complex underground apparatus was used to distill birch tar from masses of bark, which suggests that a high degree of cultural innovation and evolution took place in the European Middle Paleolithic period. While Neanderthals may have been using this process 200,000 years ago, the oldest evidence for dry distillation among modern humans only dates to 20,000 years ago. Many Neanderthal sites have evidence of fire, some for extended periods of time. They may have been using fire for cooking, keeping warm, and deterring predators. They were also capable of zoning areas for specific activities, such as for knapping, butchering, hearths, and wood storage. At Abric Romaní rock shelter, Spain, Neanderthals may have maintained eight evenly spaced hearths lined up against the rock wall, likely used to stay warm while sleeping, with one person sleeping on either side of the fire.

The only known Neanderthal tools that could have been used to fashion clothes were hide scrapers as no bone sewing-needles and stitching awls have been found as in Cro-Magnon sites. Hide scrapers could have been used to make items similar to blankets or ponchos. There is no direct evidence that Neanderthals made fitted clothes from animal hide. Unfitted clothes would have had limited range of mobility while dressed, and decreased the time Neanderthals could spend unprotected from the elements away from shelters. Dental microwear in the front teeth of Neanderthals who lived in open environments resembles that of the modern Ipiutak of Alaska and inhabitants of Nunavut, Canada, who are known to clamp hides with their front teeth while preparing them. This similarity suggests that Neanderthals may likewise have used their front teeth for hide clamping. Neanderthals appear to have lived lives of frequent traumatic injury and recovery, indicating the setting of splints and dressing of major wounds. By and large, they appear to have avoided severe infections, indicating long-term treatment. Their knowledge of medicinal plants was comparable to that of Cro-Magnons.

In 2026, a study published in PLOS One described a Neanderthal molar recovered from Chagyrskaya Cave in southwestern Siberia, dating to approximately 59,000 years ago, which bears evidence of an intentional dental procedure. Analysis of the tooth, designated Chagyrskaya 64, revealed a deep hole drilled into the chewing surface using a fine-pointed stone tool, extending into the pulp chamber in a manner consistent with cavity intervention to relieve pain—representing the earliest known instance of dental cavity treatment in human evolutionary history. Subsequent wear on the tooth indicates the individual survived the procedure. Stone tools on various Greek islands could indicate early seafaring through the Mediterranean, employing simple reed boats for one-day crossings, but the evidence for such a big claim is limited.

=== Language ===
It is unclear if Neanderthals had the capacity for complex language, but some researchers have argued that Neanderthals required complex communications to discuss locations, hunting and gathering, and tool-making techniques in order to survive in their harsh environment. In experiments with modern humans, the Levallois technique can be taught with purely observational learning without spoken instruction. While the hyoid bone (a bone that supports the tongue) is almost identical to that of modern humans, this does not provide insight into the entire vocal tract. Neanderthals had the FOXP2 gene, which is associated with speech and language development, but not the modern human variant.

=== Burials and religion ===
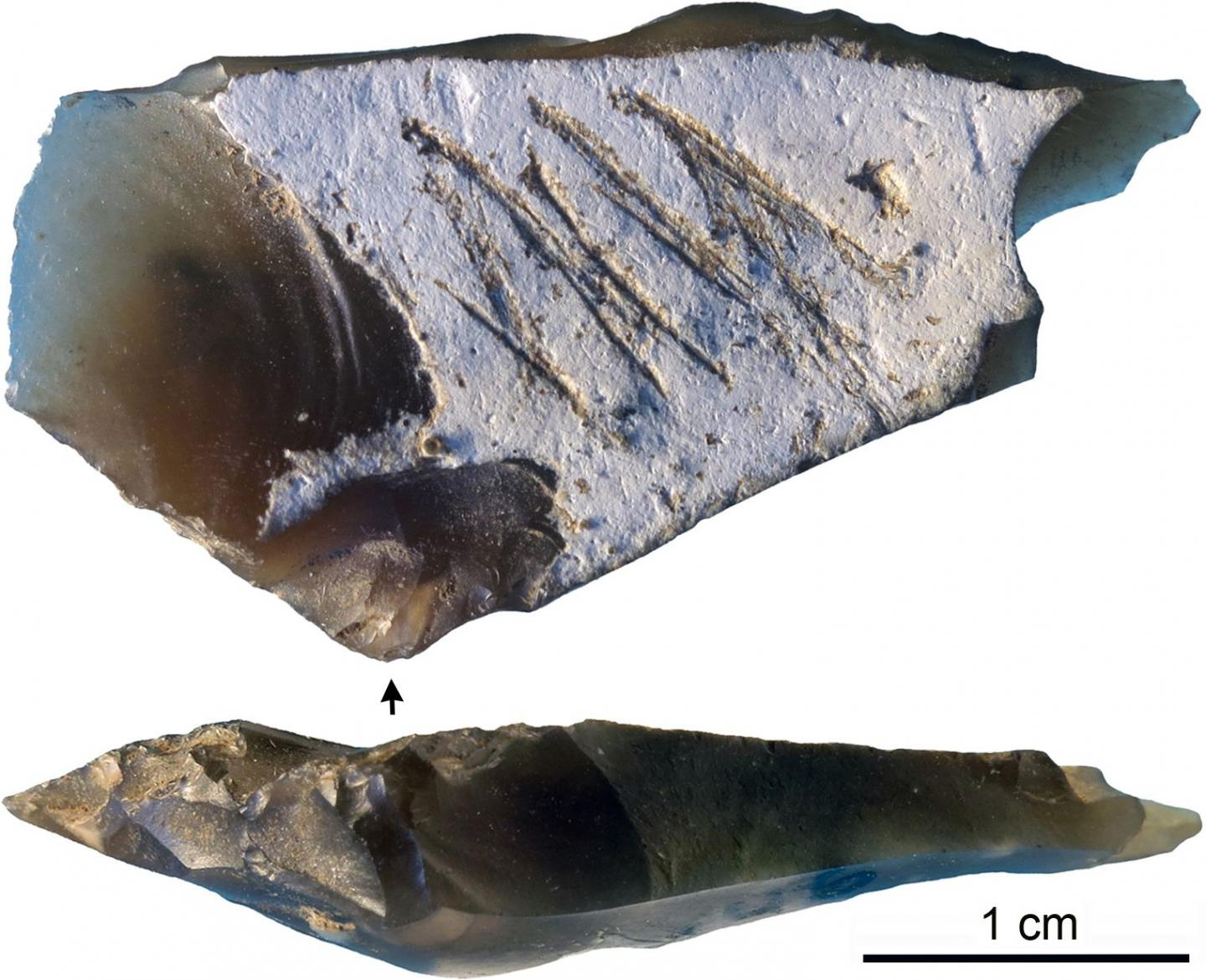
Engraved flint from a Neanderthal grave at Kiik-Koba, Crimea

Neanderthals, probably uncommonly, buried their dead. This may explain the abundance of fossil remains. The behaviour is not indicative of a religious belief of life after death because it could also have had non-symbolic motivations. The dead were buried in simple, shallow graves and pits, but special care seems to have been given to child graves. The graves of children and infants, especially, are associated with grave goods such as artefacts and bones. Some sites with multiple well-preserved Neanderthal skeletons may represent cemeteries.

One grave in Shanidar Cave, Iraq, was associated with the pollen of several flowers that may have been in bloom at the time of deposition—yarrow, centaury, ragwort, grape hyacinth, joint pine and hollyhock. The medicinal properties of the plants led American archaeologist Ralph Solecki to claim that the man buried was a leader, healer, or shaman, and that "the association of flowers with Neanderthals adds a whole new dimension to our knowledge of his humanness, indicating that he had 'soul'". It is also possible the pollen was deposited by a small burrowing rodent after the man's death. Neanderthals were once thought to have ritually killed and eaten cave bears or other Neanderthals, but the evidence is circumstantial. In 2019, the Finlaysons reported that Neanderthals disproportionately butchered the golden eagle over any bird of prey or corvid species, and speculated that Neanderthals viewed the golden eagle as a symbol of power like some recent modern human societies did.

== Interbreeding ==
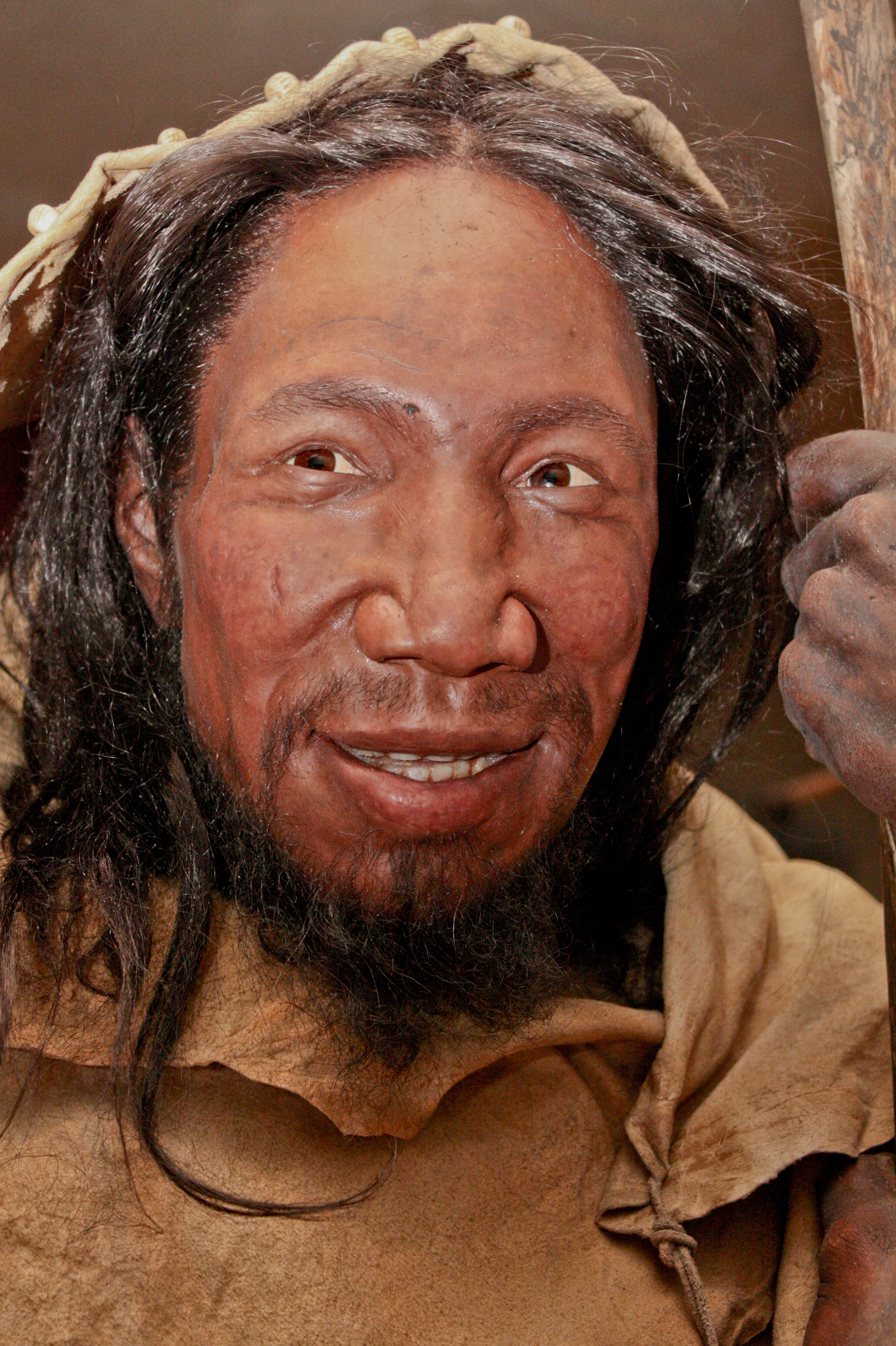
Reconstruction based on Oase 2 by the paleoartists Adrie and Alfonse Kennis. Oase 2 was a modern human from 34-38ka, with around 6% Neanderthal ancestry. An associated individual from the same cave, Oase 1, is roughly ten thousand years older and carries 6-9% ancestry.

The first high-quality Neanderthal genome sequence was published in 2010, illustrating a history of admixture between Neanderthals and modern humans. Neanderthal-derived genes descend from at least 2 interbreeding episodes outside of Africa: one about 250,000 years ago and another 40,000 to 54,000 years ago. Interbreeding also occurred in other populations which are not ancestral to any living person. An individual whose ancestry lies beyond sub-Saharan Africa may carry about 2% of Neanderthal DNA. Sub-Saharan Africans can carry Neanderthal DNA presumably descending from back migration (the interbreeding population having migrated back to Sub-Saharan Africa). In all, approximately 20% of the Neanderthal genome appears to have survived in the modern human gene pool. This Neanderthal DNA is derived primarily from the children of female modern humans and male Neanderthals.

Due to their low population and proliferation of deleterious mutations, many Neanderthal genes were probably selected out of the modern human gene pool (negative selection). Similarly, a large portion of surviving introgression appears to be non-coding ("junk") DNA with few biological functions. Some Neanderthal-derived genes, nonetheless, may have functional implications related to metabolism, brain function, and skeletal and muscular development. Some genes may have helped immigrating modern human populations acclimatise faster, such as genes related to immune response. The genetic evidence suggests that the interbreeding mainly took place between Neanderthal men and modern human women. This is based on the absence of Neanderthal mtDNA, as well as the relatively low level of Neanderthal admixture in the modern human X chromosome. According to Svante Pääbo, it is not clear that modern humans were socially dominant over Neanderthals, which may explain why the interbreeding occurred primarily between Neanderthal males and modern human females. A 2026 study confirmed the evidence of sex bias, reporting that sexual selection (i.e., a preference for male Neanderthals and modern human females) was the primary driver of the asymmetric mating patterns, rather than sex biases in demography or migration.

Neanderthals in the Siberian Altai Mountains interbred with the local Denisovan population, and it may have been a common occurrence there. About 17% of the genome of one Altai Denisovan specimen derived from Neanderthals. Even before genetic evidence had confirmed this admixture, hybridisation between Neanderthals and early modern humans had been proposed early on, such as by English anthropologist Thomas Huxley in 1890, Danish ethnographer Hans Peder Steensby in 1907, and Coon in 1962. In the early 2000s, supposed hybrid specimens were discovered: Lagar Velho 1 and Muierii 1. These proposals were based on shared anatomy, but modern geneticists have cautioned that some shared anatomy might have been acquired by adaptation to a similar environment, rather than admixture alone.

== Extinction ==
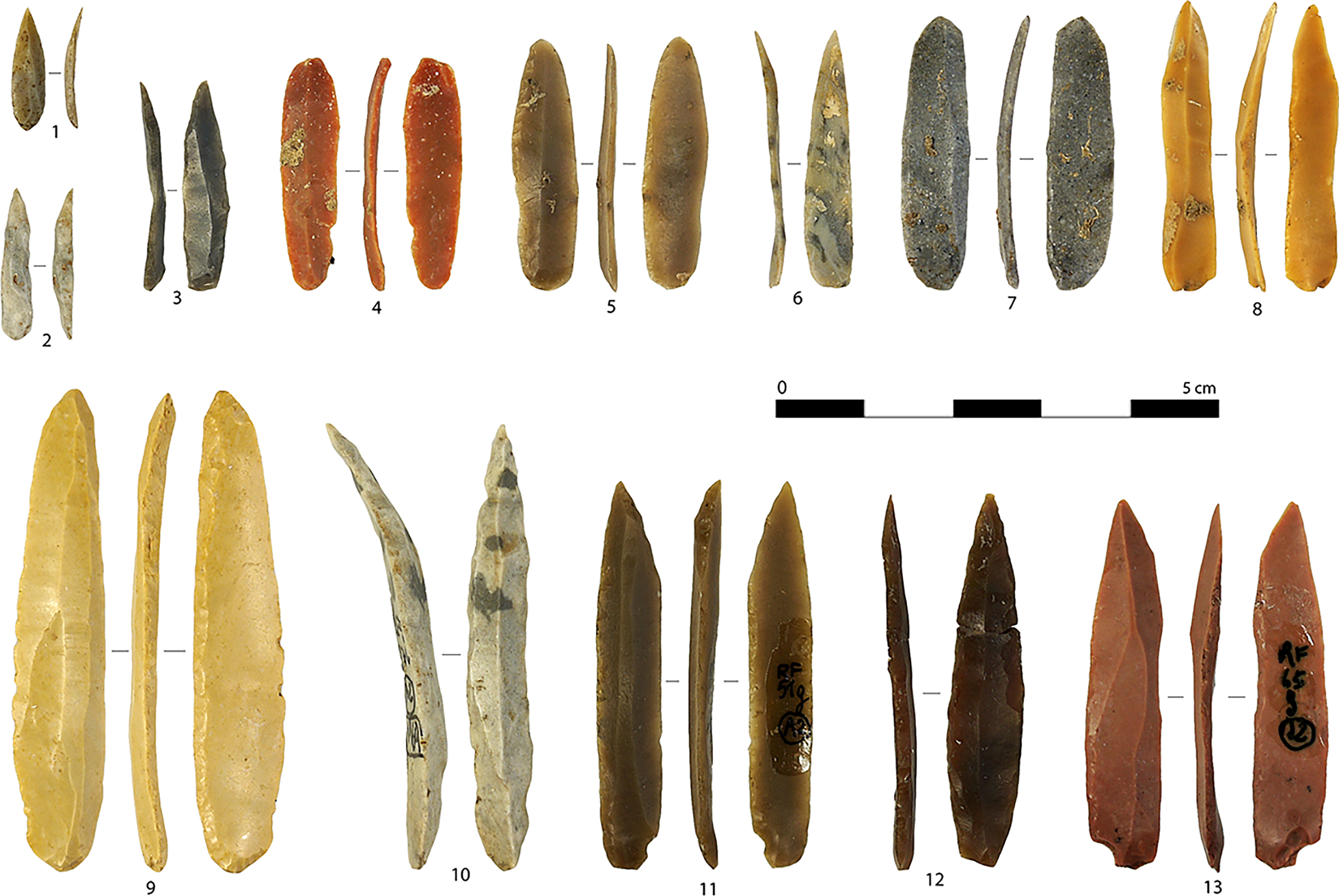
The Neanderthal Mousterian culture was replaced by modern human Aurignacian culture (above, Protoaurignacian bladelets).

The extinction of Neanderthals was part of the broader Late Pleistocene megafaunal extinction event. Neanderthals were replaced by modern humans, indicated by the near-complete replacement of Middle Palaeolithic Mousterian stone technology with modern human Upper Palaeolithic Aurignacian stone technology across Europe (the Middle-to-Upper Palaeolithic Transition) from 39,000 to 41,000 years ago. Neanderthals may have persisted in Spain for longer, but the dates of the latest Mousterian and earliest Aurignacian are poorly constrained. In Catalonia and Aragón (northern Spain), the Mousterian may have survived to about 39,000 years ago, and in southern Spain and Gibraltar potentially 32,000 to 35,000 years ago. However, others have presented evidence of Neanderthals in Gibraltar surviving even longer. Similar refuge zones have also been proposed on other temperate European peninsulas, namely Italy, the Balkans, and Crimea.

Historically, the cause of extinction of Neanderthals and other archaic humans was viewed under an imperialistic guise, with the superior invading modern humans exterminating and replacing the inferior species.

When sapiens began to expand and spread, he eliminated the other contemporary races [including Neanderthals] just as the white man drove out the Australian aborigines and the North American Indians.

— Ernst Mayr, 1950

In general, the extinction of Neanderthals is ascribed predominantly to competition with modern humans. The success of modern humans over Neanderthals is usually attributed to a higher birth rate and population, facilitated by better long-distance mobility and more complex technologies and subsistence strategies. Some Neanderthal populations may have also been assimilated into modern human populations rather than being ecologically outcompeted. Assimilation had long been hypothesised with supposed hybrid specimens, and was revitalised with the discovery of archaic human DNA in modern humans. Similarly, the Châtelperronian industry of central France and northern Spain may represent a culture of Neanderthals adopting modern human techniques, via acculturation. Other ambiguous transitional cultures include the Italian Uluzzian industry, and the Central European Szeletian industry.

Neanderthal extinction has also been ascribed to their low population as well as the resulting mutational meltdown, making them less adaptable to major environmental changes or new diseases introduced by immigrating modern humans. It is unclear if climatic degradation would have severely impacted Neanderthals given how many glacial periods they persisted through in Europe. If areas were depopulated of Neanderthals as a consequence of climate change (Note: The Laschamp event 39,000 to 42,000 years ago may have increased ultraviolet radiation, disproportionately affecting Neanderthals who lacked protective fitted clothes, and may not have utilised ochre as sunscreen to the extent Cro-Magnons did.) (specifically Heinrich event 4) or a natural disaster (the Campanian Ignimbrite eruption), Neanderthals may not have been as fast as modern humans in recolonising.

== In popular culture ==
Neanderthals have been portrayed in popular culture including appearances in literature, visual media and comedy. The informal or vernacular form of reference to the "caveman" archetype often mocks Neanderthals and depicts them as primitive, hunchbacked, knuckle-dragging, club-wielding, grunting, nonsocial characters driven solely by animal instinct. "Neanderthal" can also be used as an insult. In literature, they are sometimes depicted as brutish or monstrous, such as in H. G. Wells' The Grisly Folk and Elizabeth Marshall Thomas' The Animal Wife, but sometimes with a civilised but unfamiliar culture, as in William Golding's The Inheritors, Björn Kurtén's Dance of the Tiger, and Jean M. Auel's Clan of the Cave Bear and her Earth's Children series.

== See also ==
- Timeline of human evolution
- Denisovan – Archaic human species from Asia
- Early human migrations
- Cro-Magnon – Earliest anatomically modern humans in Europe and West Asia
- Homo floresiensis – Extinct small human species found in Flores
- Homo luzonensis – Archaic human from Luzon, Philippines
- Homo naledi – South African archaic human species

== Sources ==
- Broodbank, Cyprian (2013). The Making of the Middle Sea: A History of the Mediterranean from the Beginning to the Emergence of the Classical World. London: Thames & Hudson. ISBN 978-0-500-29208-2.
- Brown, K.; Fa, D. A.; Finlayson, G.; Finlayson, C. (2011). "Small game and marine resource exploitation by Neanderthals: the evidence from Gibraltar". Trekking the shore: changing coastlines and the antiquity of coastal settlement. Interdisciplinary contributions to archaeology. Springer. ISBN 978-1-4419-8218-6.
- Finlayson, C. (2019). The smart Neanderthal: bird catching, cave art, and the cognitive revolution. Oxford University Press. ISBN 978-0-19-251812-5.
- French, Jennifer (2021). Palaeolithic Europe: A Demographic and Social Prehistory. Cambridge University Press. ISBN 978-1-108-49206-5.
- Papagianni, D.; Morse, M. A. (2013). "Still with us?". Neanderthals rediscovered: how modern science is rewriting their story. Thames and Hudson. ISBN 978-0-500-77311-6.
- Reich, D. (2018). "Encounters with Neanderthals". Who we are and how we got here: ancient DNA and the new science of the human past. Oxford University Press. ISBN 978-0-19-882125-0.
- Shipman, P. (2015). "How humans and their dogs drove Neanderthals to extinction". The invaders: how humans and their dogs drove Neanderthals to extinction. Harvard University Press. doi:10.2307/j.ctvjf9zbs. ISBN 978-0-674-42538-5. JSTOR j.ctvjf9zbs.
- Tattersall, I. (2015). "Neanderthals, DNA, and creativity". The strange case of the Rickety Cossack: and other cautionary tales from human evolution. St. Martin's Publishing Group. ISBN 978-1-4668-7943-0.
