= Hiney (surname) =

Hiney is a surname. Notable people with the surname include:

- Don Hiney, Canadian football player
- Stephen Hiney (born 1983), Irish hurler

== See also ==
- Hindy
- Winey
