= Winey =

Winey is a surname. Notable people with the surname include:

- Brandon Winey (born 1978), American football player
- Karen I. Winey, American chemical engineer and materials scientist
- Ken Winey (born 1962), American football player
- Mark Winey, American biologist

== See also ==
- Wigney
- WINY
