= Wigney =

Wigney is a surname. Notable people with the surname include:

- Brad Wigney (born 1965), Australian cricketer
- Gloria Wigney (born 1934), Australian sprinter
- Isaac Newton Wigney (1795–1844), English banker and politician
- Michael Wigney, Federal Court of Australia judge who ruled in the Geoffrey Rush defamation case in 2019
- Stuart Wigney (born 1969), Australian rules footballer

== See also ==
- Winey
