= Graham Coop =

British-American population geneticist (born 1979)

- Born: 23 May 1979 (age 47)
- Citizenship: United Kingdom
- Education: University of Oxford
- Scientific career
- Fields: Population genetics
- Workplaces: University of California, Davis
- Thesis: The likelihood of gene trees under selective models (2004)
- Doctoral advisor: Robert Griffiths
- Other academic advisors: Jonathan Pritchard

Graham Coop (born 23 May 1979) is a British-American population geneticist. He is a professor in both the Department of Evolution and Ecology and the Center for Population Biology in the College of Biological Sciences at the University of California, Davis.
