= Mark Winey =

American biologist

Mark Winey is an American biologist currently the Dean of the UC Davis College of Biological Sciences and formerly at University of Colorado.
