= Hindy =

Hindy is a surname. Notable people with the surname include:

- Aly Hindy, Egyptian-born imam in Canada
- Iván Hindy (1890–1946), Hungarian army officer
