= Robert Griffiths (mathematician) =

Australian mathematician

Robert Charles Griffiths is an Australian mathematician and statistician known for his work in mathematical population genetics. He is an Emeritus Professor of the University of Oxford and an Emeritus Lecturer of Lady Margaret Hall. He is also an Adjunct Professor in the School of Mathematics at Monash University.

== Education ==
Robert Griffiths obtained his Ph.D. from the University of Sydney in 1970 under the supervision of G. K. Eagleson.

== Awards and honours ==
He was elected as a Fellow of the Royal Society in 2010 and a Fellow of the Institute of Mathematical Statistics in 1993.
