= UC Davis College of Biological Sciences =

The University of California, Davis College of Biological Sciences
- Type: Public
- Established: 2005
- Dean: Mark Winey
- Faculty: 130 faculty members
- Students: 5,764 students
- Undergraduates: 5,290
- Postgraduates: 474
- Location: Davis, California, U.S.
- Website: biology.ucdavis.edu

The University of California, Davis College of Biological Sciences (commonly referred to by students as the CBS) was established in 2005 and is one of four colleges and five schools on the campus of the University of California, Davis. Davis is the only UC campus that boasts a college dedicated solely to the study of biology, and is one of the only universities in the US to have such an institution. The college offers ten undergraduate majors and six minors, and has eight interdisciplinary graduate groups. The majors housed in the CBS were previously part of the Division of Biological Sciences since 1971.

In 2016, Mark Winey became Dean of the college.

Biological Sciences is the second most popular major at UC Davis, and 1/4 of the students at the university are within the CBS. Three of the top ten most popular majors at UC Davis are in the College of Biological Sciences: Biological Sciences; Neurobiology, Physiology and Behavior; and Biochemistry and Molecular Biology.
