= Paul A. Heiney =

Paul A. Heiney is an American physicist.

Heiney completed his bachelor's degree at the University of California, Santa Barbara in 1977, and became a research assistant at the Massachusetts Institute of Technology, where he remained until earning his doctorate in 1982. He subsequently held an assistant professorship at the University of Pennsylvania. Heiney became an associate professor in 1987, and was elevated to full professor in 1993. Upon retirement in 2021, he was granted emeritus status. Heiney was elected a fellow of the American Physical Society in 2001, "[f]or his contributions to our understanding of the structure, defects, disorder, and phase transitions in quasicrystals and fullerenes."
