= Prehistory of the Valencian Community =

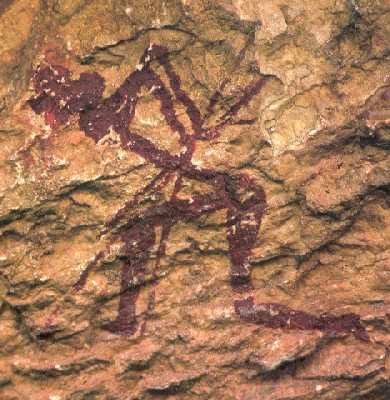
Cave painting in the Barranco de la Valltorta, Castellón.

The prehistory in the Valencian Community refers to the period from the Paleolithic (around 350,000 BCE), including the appearance of the first populations, until the appearance of colonizing peoples (Greeks, Phoenicians, and Carthaginians; around 500 BCE), in the territory of the Valencian Community.

Around 350,000 BCE, evidence of the first settlers of the current region known as the Valencian community was left in Cueva de Bolomor. About 50,000 BCE, the Neanderthals occupied the region, leading a completely nomadic existence. The Cova Negra represents this period well. Around 30,000 BCE, the Neanderthals became extinct, replaced by the anatomically modern man; and Levant was the last region populated by the dying species. This change brought an improvement in the economy and technology, and art appeared. In the Valencia region, the most common Paleolithic art was portable art (unlike other regions of the Iberian Peninsula like in Cueva de Altamira, where cave art predominates), the Cueva de Parpalló providing the best examples.

The Valencian region was one of the first to witness the agricultural revolution at the dawn of the Neolithic (5,500 BCE approximately). Ceramics appeared, like the Cardium pottery in the Mediterranean, and large settlements, like the Cova de l'Or and the Mas d'ls, were populated. Rock art from this period is abundant, especially in places like Valltorta and Pla de Petracos, the latter being a World Heritage Site.

With the dawn of the Copper Age, the number of settlements in the region increased, evidenced by the number of burial caves. Iberian cultures began to differentiate at the beginning of the Bronze Age (around 2000 BCE), and the independent culture inhabiting the region, the Bronze Valencian, was stagnant. Although limited, there were metals, like the Treasure of Villena, the second largest collection of gold in Europe. The settlements feature defensive walls, and were situated in areas difficult to access. Some major settlements are in the towns of Redondo Cabezo and Muntanya Asolada.

In the late Bronze Age, settlements were gradually depopulated, although many were revived during the Iron Age, a period when Iberian and pre-Roman culture developed in the territory.

== Paleolithic ==
=== Lower Paleolithic ===
The first traces of human settlement in the modern-day Valencian Community dates from the Lower Paleolithic; the oldest yet are found in the Cueva de Bolomor. Tools and animal bones date to around 350,000 BCE. Though no human bones from this period have been found, tools and animal remains are closely associated with the activity of Homo heidelbergensis.

The first evidence of controlled fire in the Valencian Community was also found in Bolomor, and dates to around 250,000 BCE. However, it is possible that humans inhabited this region much earlier as human remains found in other regions of the Iberian Peninsula date as far back as 800,000 BP (Before Present), and the earliest evidence of fire in central Europe dates to approximately one 500,000 BP.

=== Middle Paleolithic ===
Neanderthal remains from the Middle Paleolithic found in the region of the Valencian Community date to between 60,000 and 30,000 BCE. The evidence found in archeological sites suggests these early humans were Nomadic, that they lived in caves, and acquired sustenance by hunting wild boar, red deer, mountain goats, fallow deer, and horses, competing with other predators like the leopard, the brown bear, and the wolf. They also practiced simple funeral rituals.

Aside from cave paintings, Mousterian tools were also found. These stone tools varied little during the Middle and Lower Paleolithic; scientists believe they didn't change for 200,000 years. Nevertheless, the Neanderthals also used organic materials like wood to make lances; wooden lances have been found, infrequently, at archeological sites. However, such tools could have played an important role in the survival of these groups.

Around this time, the number of archeological sites grew, most notably the site at Cova Negra, the most important from this period. Other important sites include El Salt, the Cova de Beneito, and the Cueva del Cochino, all of which are concentrated in the south of modern-day Valencia. In September 2009, archeologists found Neanderthal remains at Solana de las Pillas, including racloirs, [denticulados], and drills, as well as charcoal fragments, dating to 50,000 BCE. This site is one of the few Valencian sites from this period not located within a cavern or cave.

By the late Middle Paleolithic, around 40,000 BCE, Cro-Magnon began expanding throughout Europe. During a period of approximately 10,000 years, the two species of hominids, the Neanderthals and the Cro-Magnon, coexisted. This eventually led to Neanderthal's extinction around 30,000 BCE; the last traces of Neanderthal activity are documented in the southern region of the Iberian Peninsula, including Valencia. Being the last region occupied by the Cro-Magnon, the end of the Middle Paleolithic was delayed compared to the north of the peninsula, as this delayed the onset of industry linked to them; the move toward industry occurred rather rapidly after its introduction.

=== Upper Paleolithic ===
The arrival of the Cro-Magnon initiated the Upper Paleolithic. There were significant advances from Neanderthal culture and technology; the technology and hunting were more specialized, populations were the less nomadic, the use of resources improved and art developed. The climatic conditions of this period were very severe for the settlements, as the planet underwent two glaciations, Würm II and Würm III.

Neanderthal technology was replaced by a system of laminar length. This system involved removing plates from stone cores expressly prepared for it. Tools were primarily carved from flint, which they made into needles, spears, and awls; they made decorations from bored teeth and shells.

In the plains, the Cro-Magnon hunted deer, while in the mountains they pursued mountain goats. The anatomically modern men selectively exploited each region; their fixed search radius indicates more restricted mobility at the group level. They also hunted smaller prey, usually rabbits in Valencia. This does not mean that the Neanderthals lacked sufficient skill to hunt smaller prey, for archeologists have found rabbit remains at Neanderthal sites; the difference is merely one of degree. Neanderthal sites contained only a few rabbit remains, indicating occasional consumption, while at some excavated Cro-Magnon settlements, rabbits represented more than 80 percent of identified remains.

Valencian sites up to the Upper Paleolithic are rare and mainly concentrated to the south of the region, covering an area along the modern-day border of Valencia and Alicante. Among those from this period are those at the Parpalló and Meravelles caves in Gandía and the Cova de les Rates Penades in Rótova.

==== Art of the Upper Paleolithic ====
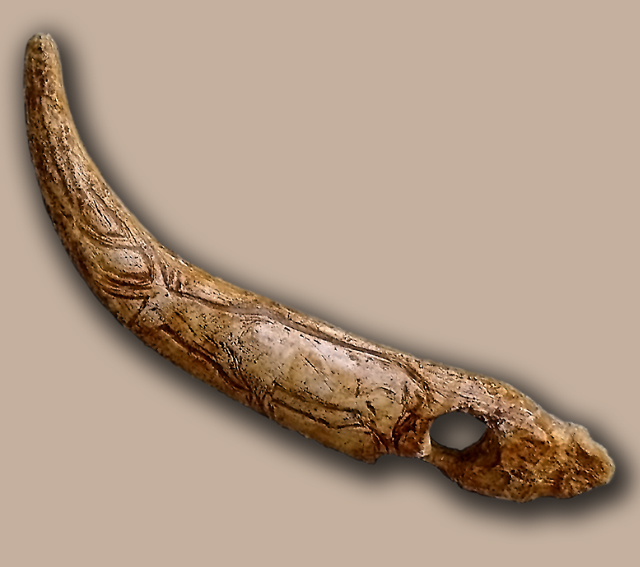
Engraved deer antler with a hole.

Paleolithic art developed in the Levant. In the Upper Paleolithic, the best-known and most comprehensive assortment of art are the cave paintings of the Iberian Peninsula. In the Valencian Community, various caves contain this type of Paleolithic art, including the Cova Fosca, Cova de Reinós, Abric d'En Melia, and the Parpalló and Meravelles caves.

However, the predominant Paleolithic art form in Valencia is portable art, that is, artistic objects that may be transported. Parpalló is exemplary of this type of art, holding a large number of decorated platelets bearing images of darts, awls, and harpoons.

The development of art is associated with the growth in the complexity and size of a society, symbolizing shared identity as well as individuality.

== Mesolithic ==
During the Mesolithic or Epipaleolithic, the climatic conditions became more mild. The glaciations of the Upper Paleolithic ended and the planet entered its current geological age, the Holocene. Forests began to expand and the polar icecaps receded, raising the sea level to modern day levels.

The improvement in the climate increased the resource availability, both animal and plant. Food sources included land mammals (mountain goats, wild boar, and rabbits), plants (fruits, berries, and roots) and marine life (fish, snails, and bivalves).

During this period, settlements last for shorter periods of time, mainly due to seasonal movements. Settlements increased near coasts and around rivers and in swamps and lagoons, with marine based economies. Open air archeological sites are more frequent than during previous periods. Some examples include Casa de Lara and Estany Gran.

Tools played an increasingly greater role, and in fact, the Mesolithic in the region of Valencia may be divided into two periods, or complexes, according to the predominant toolmaking method. The first of these uses the microlaminar method, which uses bones in the fabrication of weapons. However, around 6500 BCE, this method was abandoned, and geometric elements began to predominate in the tools. According to F.J. Fortea, this last complex may be divided further into three phases, differentiated according to the dominant geometric figures. The first phase is characterized by an abundance of trapezoids, the second by triangles, and the third by a beveled geometry.

Settlements in the Valencian Community expanded considerably during the Mesolithic, increasing in number and even scattering throughout Castellón province, where few pre-Mesolithic artifacts have been found. Among the various settlements are Cueva de la Cocina, Cova Fosca, Cova de Santa Maira, Tossal de la Roca, Abric de les Malledetes, Cova dels Balus, and Cova Matutano. The Cueva de la Cocina is famous for the incredible number of flint tools, especially arrows, found there, and for its plates of stone covered in geometric shapes. The Cova Fosca is well known for its small scale cave drawings depicting hunting and fighting.

== Neolithic ==
The Neolithic arrived on the Levant peninsula around 5550 BCE and eventually arrived on the Iberian Peninsula. During this period new systems of production and materials like ceramic and polished were developed. Agriculture and livestock changed settlement patterns and territorial organization. Some of the richest artifact deposits of all the western Mediterranean are found in the region between Valencia and Alicante.

The economic system changed dramatically during the Neolithic. Societies transitioned from hunting and gathering economies to sedentary agrarian economies. Neolithic man constructed large ceramic containers and silos to store surplus grain. Archeological discoveries indicate wheat, barley, and legumes were the staple grains during the Neolithic. Domesticated cattle, sheep, goats and pork also provided food.
