= Bear worship =

Traditional religious practice venerating bears

An 1871 ukiyo-e print of a bear being kept in captivity by Utagawa Kunisada II (国貞筆), from the album 'Scenes of Hokkaido.'

Bear worship (also known as arctolatry) is a form of animal worship and is the religious practice of worshipping bears. Bears are often viewed as ancestors or spiritual messengers by those who practice arctolatry. The practice can involve both the reverence and ritual slaughter of bears. Archaeologists have debated the advent of the ceremonial treatment of bear remains, but some evidence suggests the practice may date back to the Middle Paleolithic in Neanderthal populations. Bear worship is a common practice across many circumpolar northern cultures. The practice is associated with bear remains and can be traced back geographically to North Eurasian populations, including the Ainu, Nivkh, Sámi, Finno-Ugric, and other Siberian peoples.

== Background ==
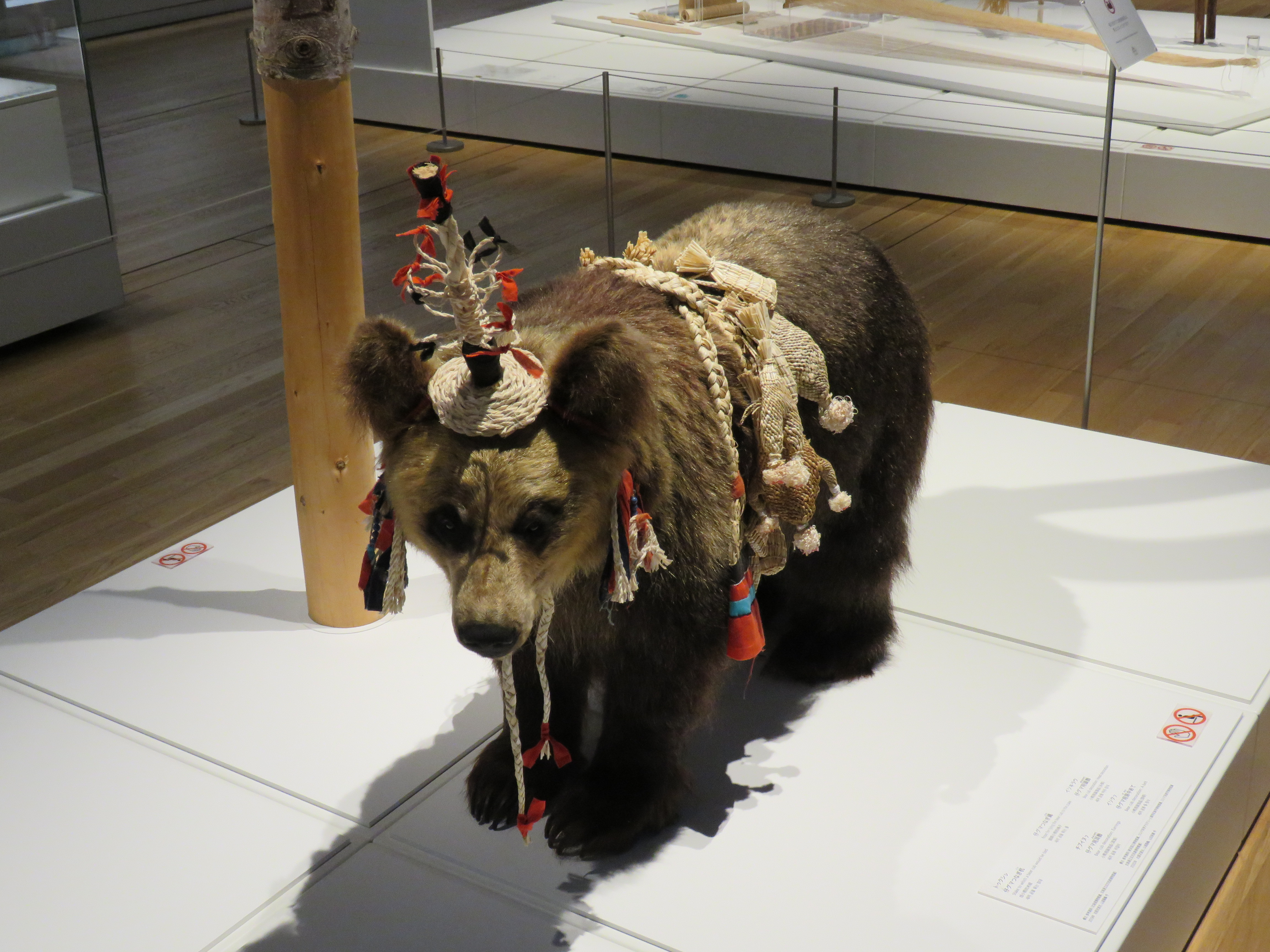
Taxidermied Ursus arctos lasiotus on display at National Ainu Museum, Hokkaido, Japan.

=== Linguistics ===
Bear worship is sometimes referred to as "arctolatry." The term arctolatry combines two distinct linguistic roots. The prefix "arcto-" comes from the Ancient Greek word "arktos," meaning "bear," which itself shares a root with the Proto-Indo-European word for bear. The suffix "-latry" comes from the Greek word "latreia," meaning "worship" or "service," stemming from latris, meaning "servant" or "worshipper."

=== Possible earliest sites ===
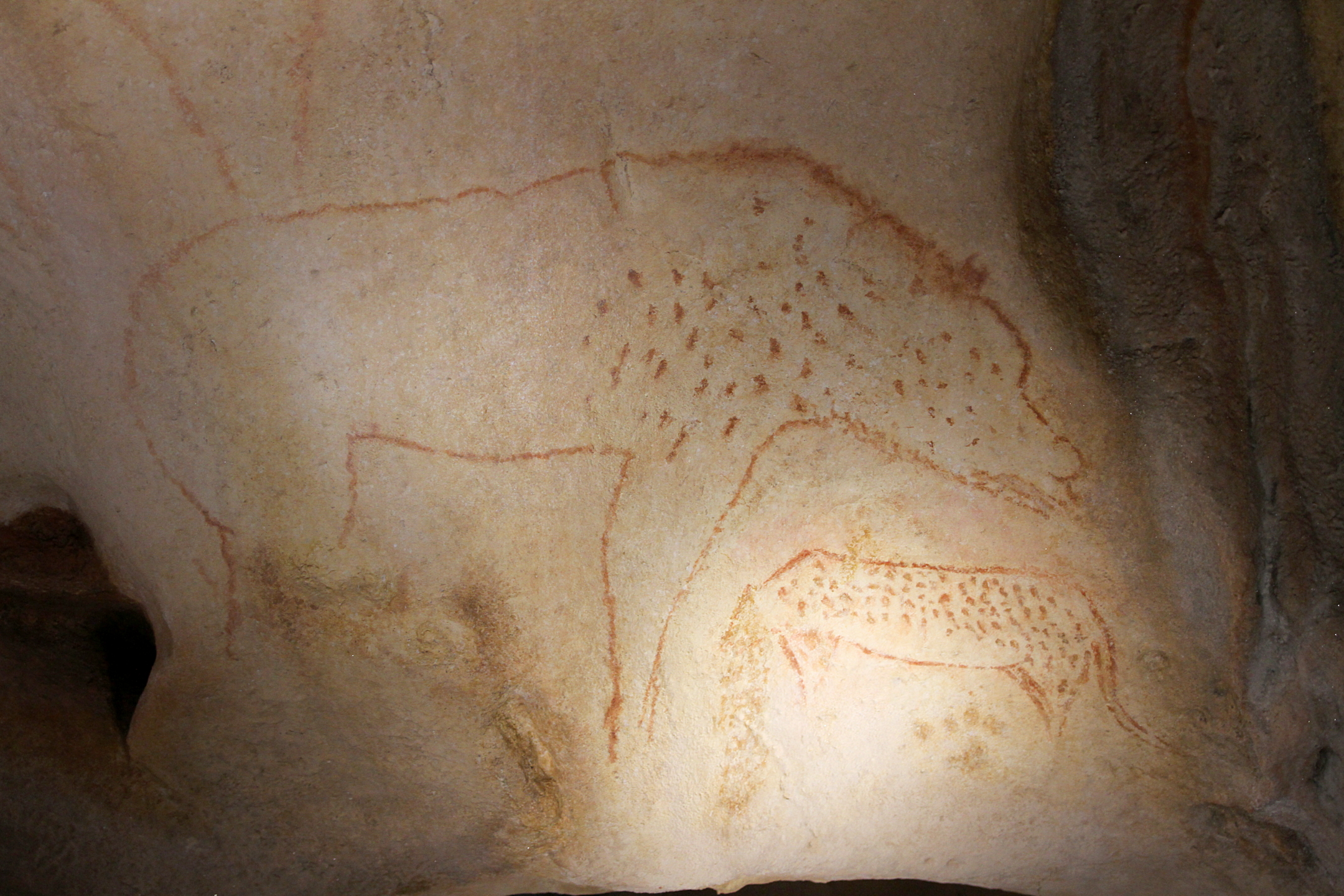
Bear and panther in the Pont d'Arc cave.

The existence of an ancient bear cult among Neanderthals in Western Eurasia during the Middle Paleolithic has been a subject of debate in the archaeological community. Some archaeologists suggest that the bear was considered a primeval god and the she-bear a mother goddess. Some archaeologists have suggested that Neanderthals worshipped the cave bear (Ursus spelaeus). Ancient bear bones have been discovered in several caves. The earliest representation of bears in a cave was found in the Eastern Pyrenees.

During excavations, some on-site archaeologists try to determine whether the bones were arranged in a way that could only have resulted from direct intervention rather than natural deposition. Some archaeologists, such as Roger Constant, consider this evidence of a bear cult that originated during the Paleolithic period. Constant has defended the idea of a bear cult and played a role in the reintroduction of live bears near a discovery site.

=== Assessing evidence ===
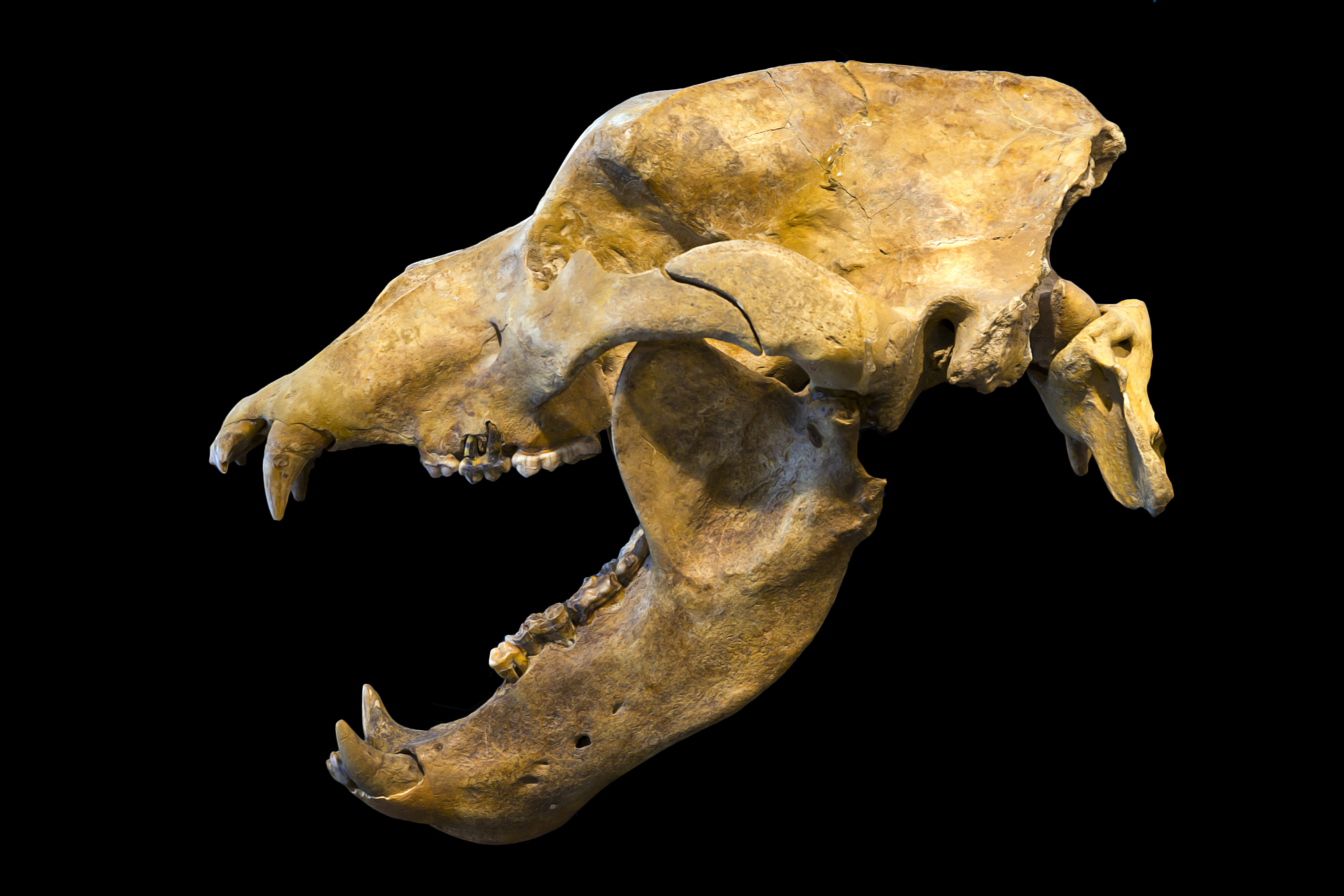
Skull and atlas of a cave bear (Ursus spelaeus, Rosenmüller, 1794)

The existence of an ancient bear cult among Neanderthals in Western Eurasia in the Middle Paleolithic has been a subject of conjecture due to contentious archaeological findings. Evidence suggests that Neanderthals could have worshipped the cave bear (Ursus spelaeus), and bear bones have been discovered in several cave sites across Western Eurasia. It was not just the presence of these bones, but their peculiar arrangement that intrigued archaeologists. During excavations, on-site archaeologists determine if the bones were arranged in such a way that could only have resulted from direct intervention rather than natural deposition processes.

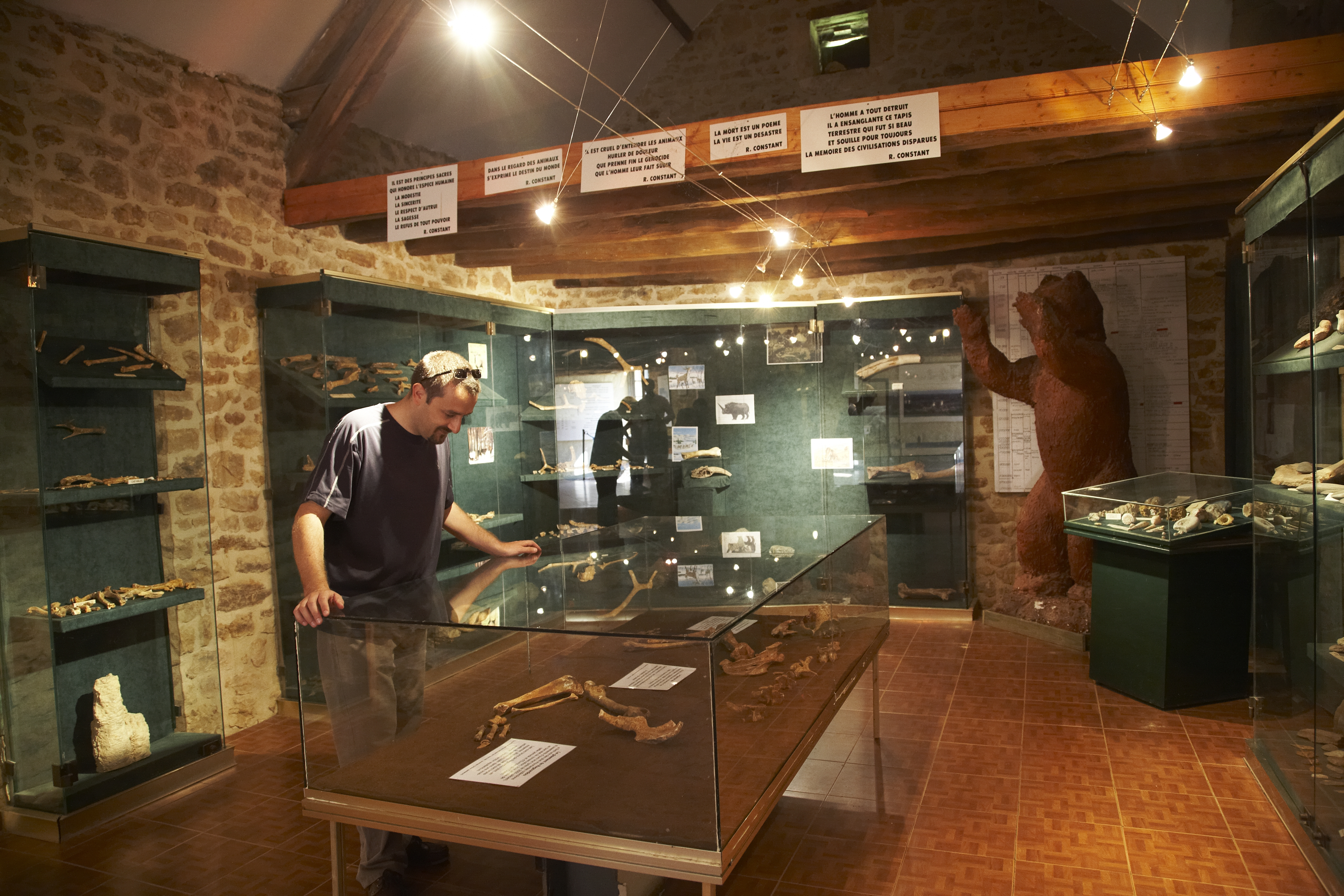
Exhibition of remains found at Le Régourdou in France.

While these findings have been taken to indicate an ancient bear cult, other interpretations of the remains have led some to conclude that the presence of bear bones in these contexts is a natural phenomenon. Ina Wunn, based on the information archaeologists have about early hominins, contends that if Neandertals did worship bears, there would be evidence of it in their settlements and camps. However, most bear remains have been found in caves. Many archaeologists now theorise that, since most bear species hibernate in caves during the winter, the presence of bear remains is not unusual in this context. Bears that lived inside these caves may have perished from natural causes such as illness or starvation. Wunn argues that the placement of these remains is due to natural, post-deposition events such as wind, sediment, or water. Therefore, in Wunn's view, the assortment of bones remaining in the caves does not stem from human activities, and there is no clear evidence of a bear cult during the Middle Paleolithic era.

Ainu performing Iomante in Sakhalin Island.

Emil Bächler, a proponent of the bear-cult hypothesis, found bear remains in Switzerland and at Mornova Cave (Mornova zijalka) in Slovenia. Alongside Bächler's discovery, André Leroi-Gourhan found bear skulls arranged in a circle in Saône-et-Loire. Some archaeologists, such as Bächler, have used these excavations to support the idea of an ancient bear cult, suggesting that the bones were intentionally arranged as part of a ceremony because they were arranged in ways that they believed were not naturally possible.

== Process ==
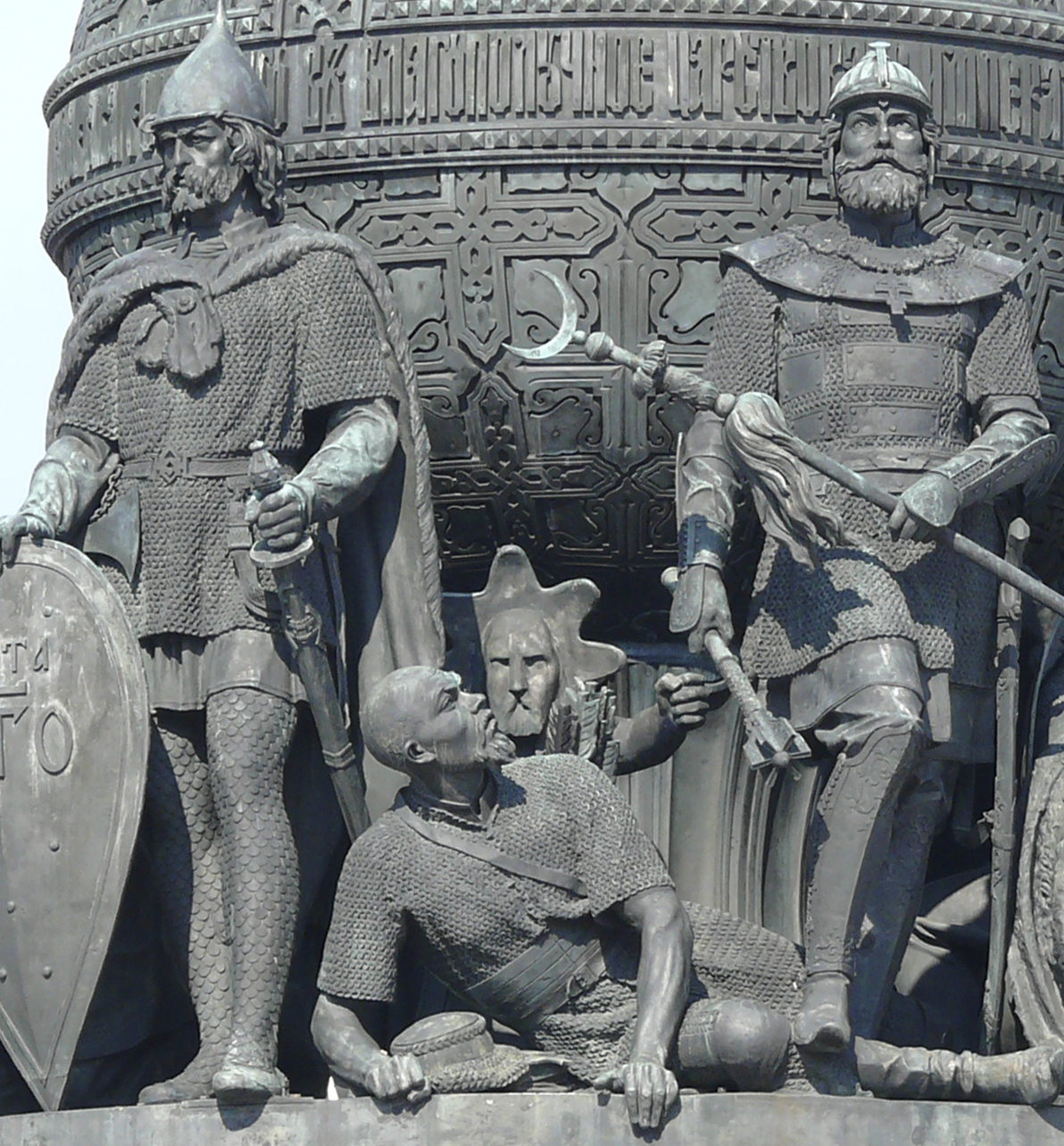
Volos (also called Veles) in the background of the Millennium of Russia Monument

While each culture has its own practices around bear worship, a ceremony can begin years before the bear is sacrificed. It may start when male hunters find a bear den, kill the mother bear, and capture a bear cub. People then raise the cub as if it were one of their own children. Raising a bear takes one to five years, depending on its age at sexual maturity and sex. Generally, female bears are raised for a shorter time than male bears. (Note: Villages raise bear cubs for different lengths of time. For example, the Gvasyugi people raise them for one to two years. Similarly, the Ulch people of the Amur region opt for a longer period, typically three to four years, before they perform the ritual sacrifice.)

Families raise bears in captivity with their animals and children. They usually care for a bear cub until it grows too large, before sacrificing it. (Note: According to one account of the Ulch bear ceremony, “[the] bear slept with the dogs and came out to play and to be hand fed by the woman of the house". Bear cubs have been seen drinking milk from human women. Indigenous children may get scolded for being jealous of how bears are treated in the encampment.)

Before the sacrifice, villagers entertain the bear to ensure a good sendoff. They splash water on each other, wrestle, hold dog races, and play games. The goal is to make the bear’s send-off enjoyable. This is believed to bring good fortune from the spirits after the bear’s sacrifice.

A painting of Local Customs of the Ainu by Anonymous (19th c.) depicting the practice of Iomante

In Ulch bear ceremonies, two men guide the bear on chains around an ice hole, and it is a sign of good luck if it drinks. The men then walk to the killing site, which is called "arachu," while women play rhythms on a hollow log and dance. After sacrificing a bear, each male hunter must touch its skin. This act is thought to bring the blessing of the taiga for a successful hunting season.

In some societies, the bear is taken around the village for final goodbyes before being led to a nearby forest location for the sacrifice, typically within a mile of the village. During the sacrifice, it is important to respect the bear. Disrespectful actions include being barefoot or using a gun. Instead, the bear should be killed with a bow and arrow, a knife, or a spear. It is also important to use careful language. Phrases such as “I obtained a child” may be used in some cultures to refer to the sacrifice, as some groups believe direct language can offend both the bear and the gods overseeing the environment.

The ceremony involves sacrificing the bear by injuring its heart. Then, the people skin, cook, and feast on the bear meat. After the sacrifice, celebrations include children's plays, women playing instruments, and performances of dances, myths, and songs for the bear ceremony. Some scholarly records show that families often use the bear head as a protective ornament in their homes.

== Cultural traditions ==
=== Greek culture ===
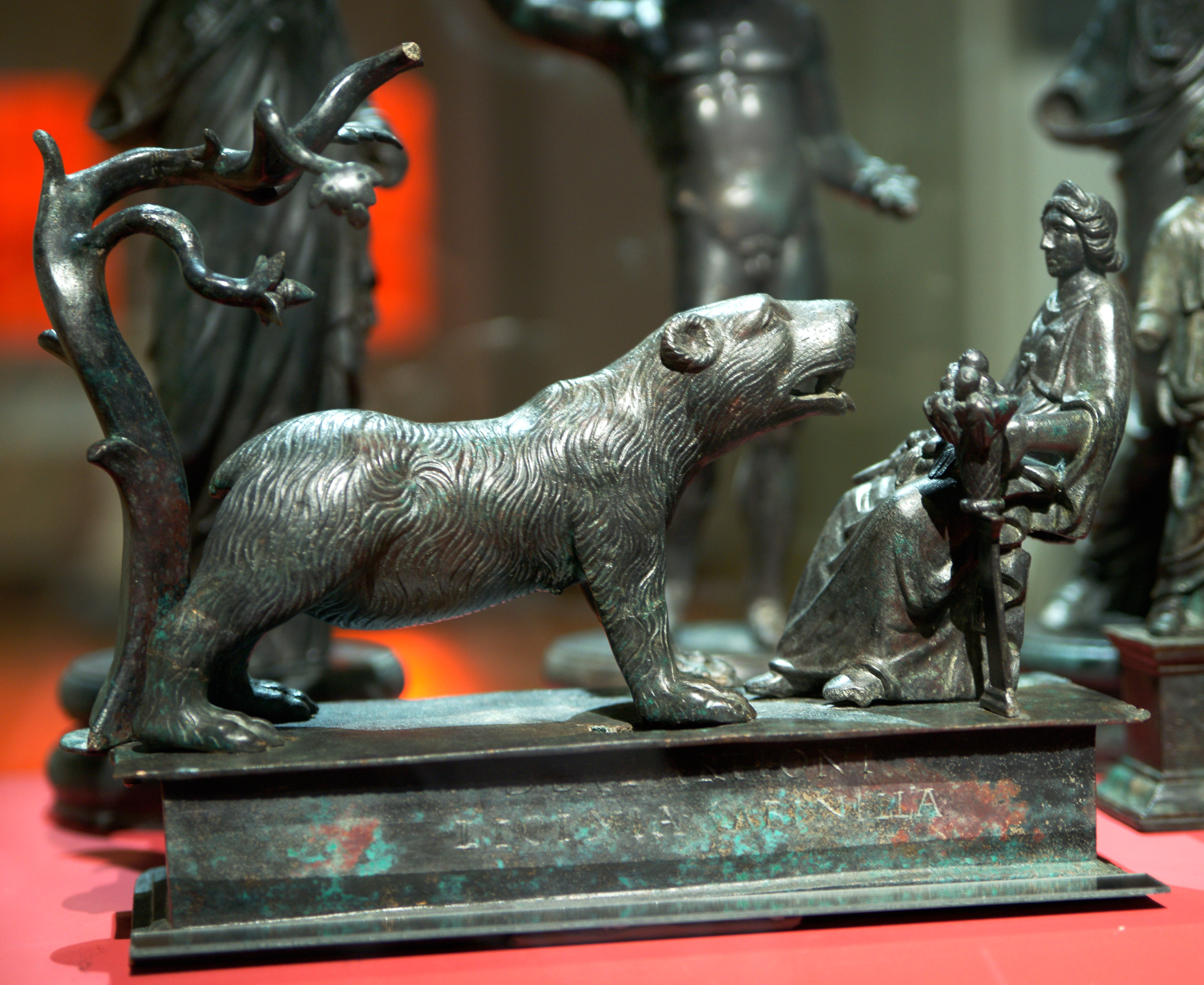
The goddess Artio from the Muri statuette group, a collection of bronze figures of Gallo-Roman found in Muri bei Bern, Switzerland, 1832.

The bear in Greek mythology was aligned with the goddess Artemis. Artemis is the daughter of Zeus, king of Olympus, and Leto, goddess of night and day. She reigns over forests and mountains, with powers over wild animals and the hunt. In the testimony of Pausanias, during his stay in Patras, he described the annual festival of the sanctuary of Artemis Laphria, where bear cubs were burned alive on the sacred altar.

In Greek mythology, the goddess Artemis is linked to the story of Iphigenia, the daughter of Agamemnon, the king of Mycenae. The story begins when Agamemnon kills a deer that belongs to Artemis. As a result, the seer Calchas tells the king that he must sacrifice his daughter to please the goddess. At the last moment, Artemis steps in to save Iphigenia and replaces her with a bear.

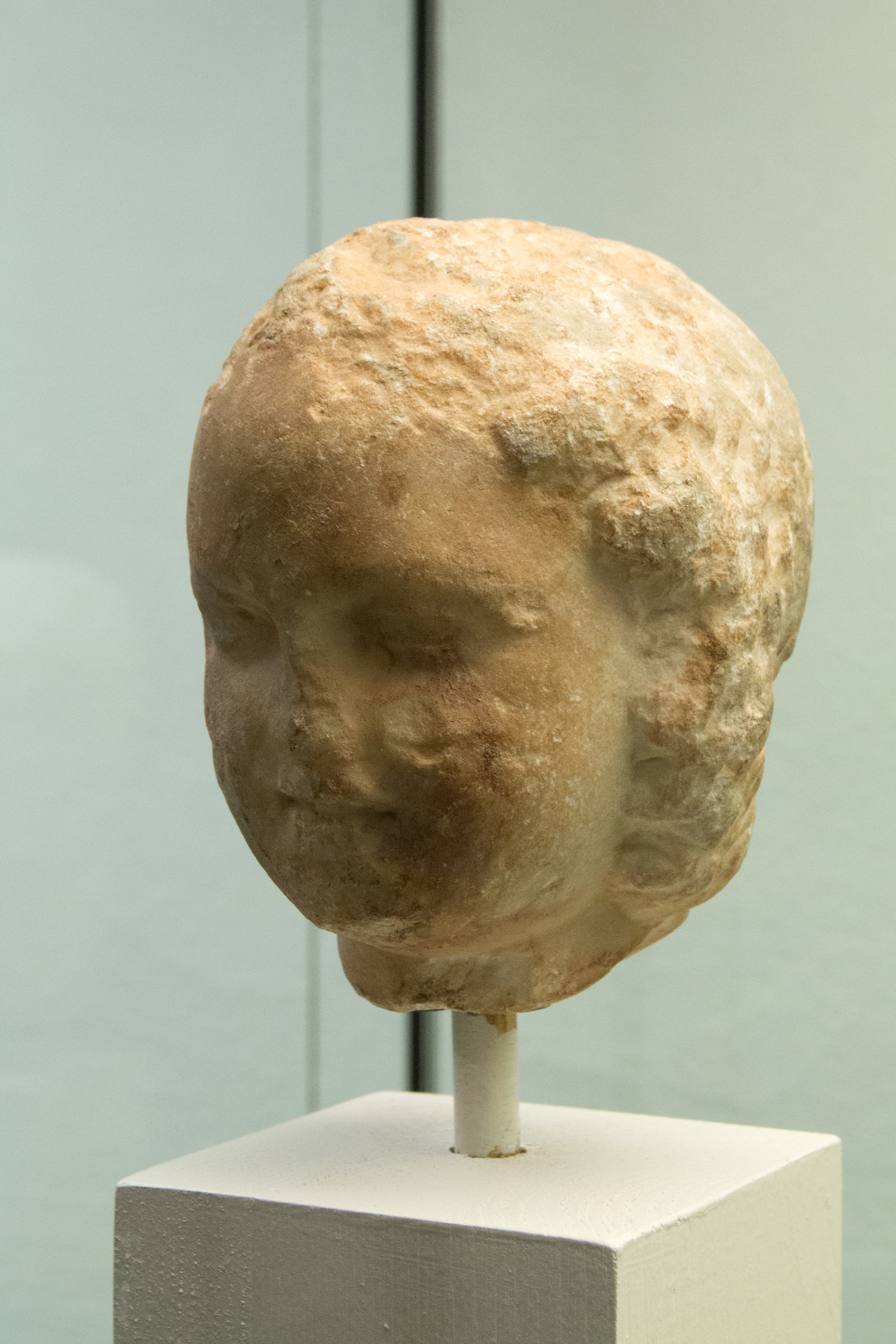
Head of a "bear virgin" dedicated to the temple of Artemis

There is another story about an Athenian girl who was playing with a bear at the sanctuary of Artemis Brauronia. She accidentally provoked the bear and got scratched. In revenge, her brothers killed the bear, angering Artemis. To punish Athens, the goddess sent a plague. To then stop the plague, the Oracle of Delphi advised that all girls aged five to ten take part in a ritual at the sanctuary. This ritual involved "acting the bear" to calm Artemis. Over time, it became a tradition that no girl could marry without first serving as a "bear" or "Arktoi" for the goddess.

There is also the story of the nymph Callisto, who, according to legend, was transformed into the constellation Ursa Major. Callisto was the daughter of Lycaon, king of Pelagonia, later Arcadia. A woman of great beauty, she dedicated herself to Artemis, took a vow of chastity, and assisted the goddess when she went hunting. But Zeus fell in love with her and adopted the appearance of Artemis to possess her. Callisto decided to hide her condition from the goddess, who discovered the deception one day while they were bathing in the river. Artemis transformed her into a she-bear, and in this state she gave birth to a boy named Arcas, interpreted as "bear-man." Her son became king of Arcadia. One day, while out hunting, he encountered his mother, a she-bear, who stopped upon seeing her son. Just as he was about to kill her, Zeus intervened, preventing matricide. Swept up by a strong wind, they were sent to the sky, transforming them into two constellations: Callisto into the Ursa Major and Arcas into Ursa Minor. (Note: Also known as the Bear Keeper/Guardian.)

Another myth is that of King Iasus of Arcadia, or the land of bears. A descendant of Arcas, where men fought wearing bear skins, Iasus had a daughter, Atalanta, whom he abandoned on Mount Parthenius because he only wanted male offspring. The girl survived, suckled by a she-bear. When she grew up, hunters found her and gave her a strict upbringing. Atalanta returned to her father and agreed to marry the suitor who won a race. The winner was Hippomenes, aided by Aphrodite, and he won the kingdom of Arcadia. Hippomenes forgot to thank Aphrodite, and the goddess transformed the couple into lions.

Priam, king of Troy, had a son with his wife Hecuba. She dreamed she would give birth to a torch that would set the city on fire, interpreted as the destruction of the kingdom. Her son, named Paris, was given to a servant who abandoned him on Mount Ida, where he was suckled by a she-bear. Shepherds found him and raised him. Once returned to Troy, he sailed to the Peloponnese where he fell in love with Helen. Her abduction provoked the Trojan War.

=== Roman culture ===
In classical Rome, the Roman interpretation of Artemis was the goddess Diana, often depicted with a bow or deer. Other gods linked to Diana include the Celtic Arduina, accompanied by a boar, venerated in the Ardennes, Andarta, and Artio of the Helvetii. These goddesses were sometimes considered to have bear-like traits.

=== Pyrenees regional culture ===
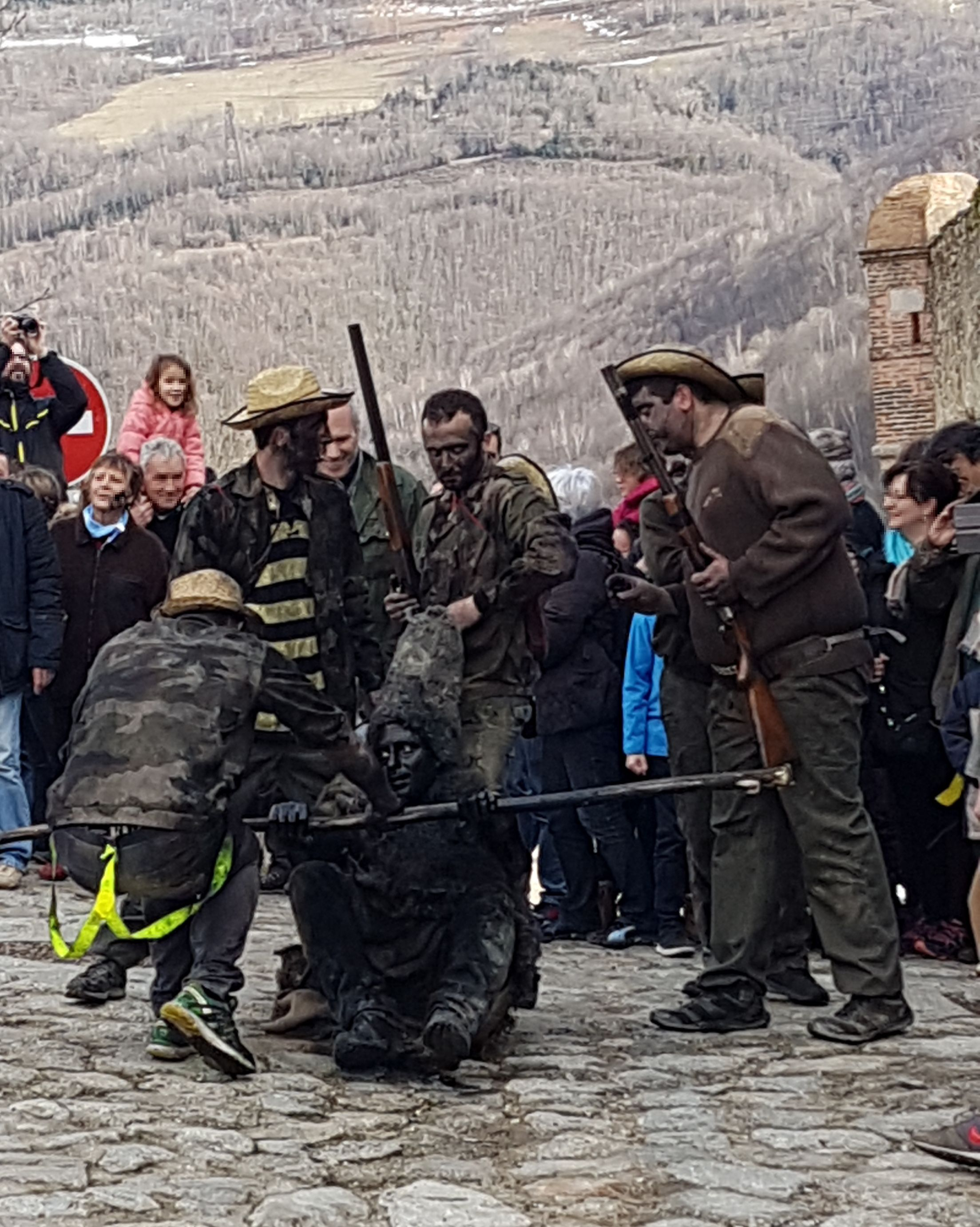
Bear and hunters at the 2018 Fête de l'Ours in Prats-de-Mollo.

There are annual bear festivals held in various towns and communes across the Pyrenees region of Spain and France. Every year, towns and communities in the Pyrenees hold bear festivals. There are six main bear dances in the Pyrenees, as described by Eloi Ysàs. The festivals where these dances are performed can be found: three in Northern Catalonia—the Bear Festivals of Vallespir, in the towns of Prats de Mollo, Arles, and Saint-Laurent-de-Cerdans, two in the Central Pyrenees, (Note: The Bear Dance of Encamp and the Carnival of Bielsa, and one in the Western Pyrenees, the Carnivals of Ituren and Zubieta.)

In Prats de Mollo, the bear festival or bear dance is celebrated on Candlemas on February 2. It is a ritual in which men dressed as bears brandish sticks that frighten people through the streets. Previously, the festival centred on the "bears" attacking women and trying to blacken their chests (with soot), which was scandalous for observers seeing it for the first time from outside. (Note: From the testimony of someone who remembered the old days, the festival in Prats de Mollo included elaborate staging, much like the Arles version.) There is also a similar festival in the town of Sant Llorenç de Cerdans. (Note: Called Festa de l'ós de Sant Llorenç de Cerdans These festivals take place in the region of Vallespir and are known as Fêtes de l'ours en Vallespir, Festes de l'os al Vallespir, or El dia de l'os/dels ossos.).

The Arles version Fête de l'ours d'Arles-sur-Tech includes a female character named Rosetta who was kidnapped by the bear. Rosetta was usually performed by a man or boy dressed as a girl. The bear would take Rosetta to a hut in the town square, where she would eat sausages, cake, and drink white wine. The event would end with the bear being shaved and killed. Andorra also has festivals honoring the she-bear. (Note: Known as Festes de l'ossa. These include the Ball de l'ossa ('she-bear's dance') in Encamp, and Última ossa ('the last she-bear') in Ordino. There is also a bear-related festival in the Valencian town of La Mata, named Festa de l'Onso de la Mata)

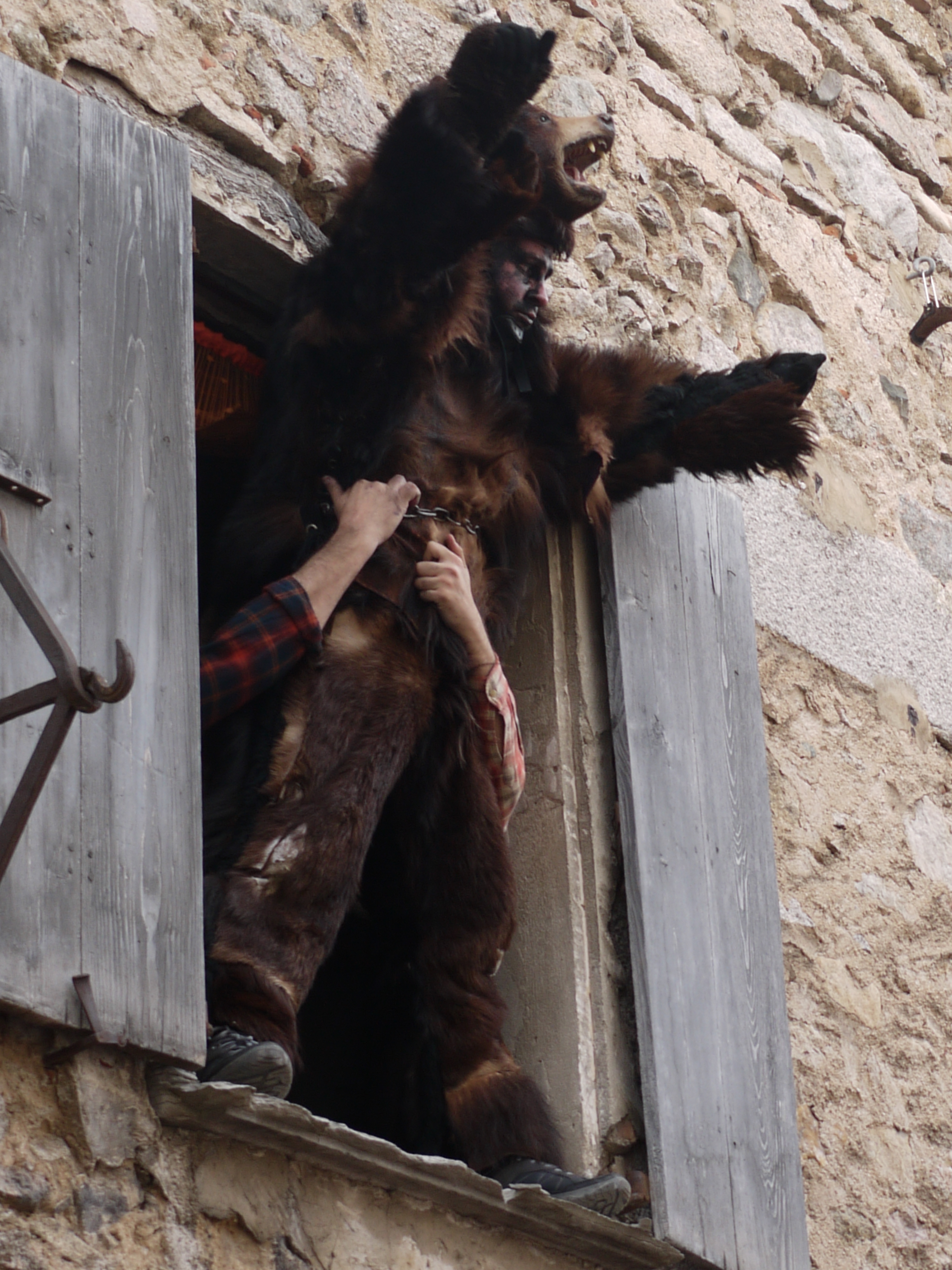
Fête de l'ours in Saint-Laurent-de-Cerdans.

Until 1972, at the Saint-Laurent-de-Cerdans bear festival, people used to have a "bestiassa" (beast) take a young woman into the forest. However, now, when the bear catches the girl, a group of young men appears, chases the bear, and the leader, known as the "Menaire," catches it. They bring the bear, chained, back to the town. The Menaire shows off his prize and receives gifts from the homes while reciting the "Pèrdica" (Predication), which is a 48-verse poem in Catalan.

=== Siberian cultures ===
Bear ceremonies are prevalent among many indigenous Siberian peoples living within modern day Russia. The Khanty and Mansi peoples in the Western Siberian taiga practice it. Additionally, there were practictioners from Oroqen (Ulta), Ulch, Udege, and Oroch groups who reside in the Russian Far Eastern regions of Sakhalin and the maritime coast respectively. The Nivkh, who come from the north of Sakhalin Island and the area around the lower Amur River, have also practiced bear worship.

The ceremonies are usually grounded in the belief that everything has a soul and that people should live in harmony with nature. Some indigenous cultures in Siberia do not allow hunting bears, except in certain situations. Bears can only be hunted if they directly threaten human life or property, such as when they have harmed people or entered homes.

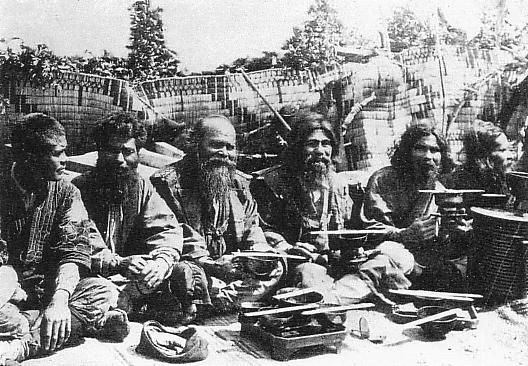
Ainu men undertaking the practice of Iomante in 1930.

The bear ceremony among many Siberian peoples involves specific roles for men and women. Generally, only men can hunt and kill the bear. Women care for the bear cub, raising it like a child by allowing it to drink human milk and entertaining the cub with music and dance. In some cultures, the bear tongue is given to the eldest male as a sign of respect.

Bear ceremonies in Siberian indigenous cultures limit the traditional role of shamans, who usually serve as intermediaries between people and spirits. During bear ceremonies, people communicate directly with spirits without a shaman, particularly in the Amur region.

=== Russian state perceptions ===
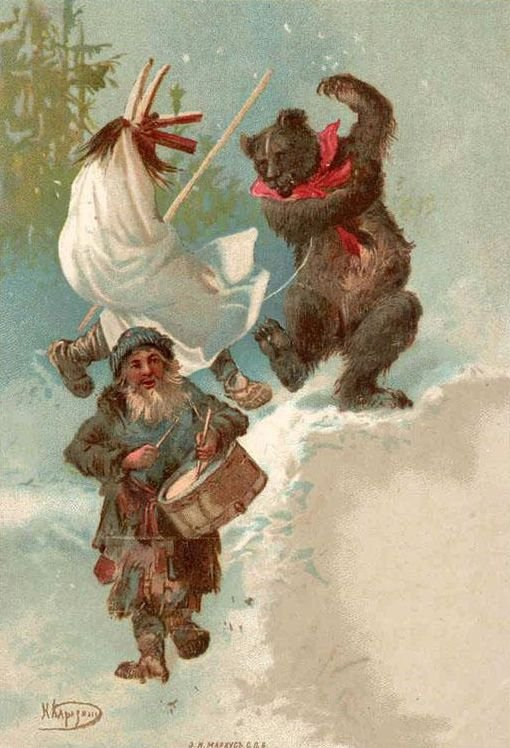
A bear Christmas Card by Russian artist and writer Nikolai Karazin

Centuries-long state repression of cultural traditions and spiritualism has led to an overall decline in bear worship among indigenous populations in Siberia. Throughout the 20th century, bear ceremonies in Siberia became a rarely observed phenomenon. Indigenous Siberian populations have had a contentious relationship with the Russian state since the beginning of the colonial era. However, in the modern day, sources of cultural contention have also had economic implications. For example, raising a bear cub in a village is costly for the participants in the ceremony. The Ob-Ugrian intelligentsia began reviving bear worship in the 1980s and 1990s, when state repression of indigenous cultures had eased. Since then, tourist participation in Khanty bear ceremonies has also increased.

As a pagan practice, tsarist Christianising efforts often sought to suppress bear ceremonies in Siberia due to its undermining Russian Orthodox hegemony at the time. Until the early 18th century, the Russian tsardom did not necessarily seek to propagate Christian Orthodoxy among indigenous Siberian populations. Native Siberian paganism was not regarded as a faith until this spiritual worldview came to be seen as a threat to the legitimacy of the Russian Orthodox Church.

Mihaly von Zichy's drawing of The Bear Hunt of Tsar Alexander II from 1872.

Soviet control led to repressive attitudes toward bear worship among indigenous Siberian peoples. Although religion was tolerated in theory, the socialist state sought to limit paganism, as this practice was antithetical to the ideal of Marxist-Leninist atheism, adopted as the official attitude toward religion and spiritualism more broadly in the Soviet Union. Bear worship, and paganism more generally, was also perceived as a threat to Marxist-Leninist ideology with regard to humans’ relationship with their surrounding natural environment. (Note: According to Stephen Dudeck, an anthropologist specialising in indigenous Siberian cultures, "The opposition between the ideological place of nature as a force to be conquered according to Soviet ideology, and the complex and negotiated social relationship with the environment reflected in Indigenous rituals, should not have gone unnoticed.") On a practical level, feasting was blamed for distracting workers in the newly created state-controlled enterprises from disciplined work." (Note: See Slezkine, 1994.)

Bear hunting has led to conflicts between indigenous Siberian cultures and Russian authorities. For instance, the Khanty have subsistence hunting rights in their traditional region, but the Russian legal framework imposes a heavy financial burden by mandating “expensive and difficult to procure individual species licenses for non-food hunting and trapping.” There have been reports of Ob-Ugrians being arrested for hunting bears that had previously posed a dangerous threat to people in the village, which is a central pillar of “revenge on the bear.” The “revenge on the bear” constitutes one of the beliefs in bear worship, whereby bears are never to be hunted unless they harm humans first. This practice is particularly characteristic of societies living in the Amur region of Siberia.

The Russian oil and gas extraction industry has significantly degraded the natural habitats of bears in the Siberian taiga. This has led to increased numbers of bears wandering into human villages and potential attacks on inhabitants. As a result, attacked inhabitants sometimes illegally engage in bear hunting. One member of the Khanty indigenous Siberian group remarked, “We protest the destruction of the natural environment in our area, which is turning into our own destruction. We understand that the country needs oil, but not at the expense of our lives! All local industrial works operate as if we weren’t here, as if our ancestors weren’t here, as if our existence were over. Where are the principles of government policy toward Native peoples?"

Bear worship has also been commercialised (Note: For more information, see Moldanova 2016 and Wiget and Balalaeva 2022 regarding commercialisation across okrug.) festival programs in Khanty-Mansiĭsk in recent times with the marketing of "festival shirts, decorated with rickrack, and felt hats, decorated with traditional symbols.”

==== Nivkh culture ====
A Nivkh bear festival around 1903.

A bear festival is celebrated by the indigenous Nivkh in the Russian Far East who live north of Sakhalin Island as well as around the lower Amur River. A Nivkh shaman (чам, ch'am) would preside over the Bear Festival, which was celebrated in the winter between January and February, depending on the clan carrying it out. Bear cubs were captured and raised in a pen for several years by local women, who treated the cubs as if they were children. The bear is considered a sacred earthly manifestation of Nivkh ancestors and gods in bear form. During the festival, the bear is dressed in the specially made ceremonial costume and offered a banquet to take back to the realm of the gods to show benevolence upon the clans.

After the banquet, the bear is killed and eaten in an elaborate religious ceremony. The festival was arranged by relatives to honour the death of a kinsman. The bear's spirit returns to the gods of the mountain, 'happy', and rewards the Nivkh with bountiful forests. Generally, the Bear Festival was an inter-clan ceremony where a clan of wife-takers restored ties with a clan of wife-givers upon the broken link of the kinsman's death. The Bear Festival was suppressed in the Soviet period. Since then, the festival has had a modest revival, albeit as a cultural rather than a religious ceremony.

Ainu practice of omante, or the sacrifice of a bear, from Mr Ludvig Munsterhjelm’s expedition to Sakhalin in 1914.

Some of the indigenous peoples of the Amur region (Note: This includes Tungusic groups such as the Ulch, Evenki, Ducher, Solon, Jurchen, Nanai, and Daur people and can include some groups of Ainu and Nivkhs.) seek to worship the bear not as an act of kinship, but as a means of reverence to their natural environment. Tungusic peoples generally sacrifice a bear to return the bear to the masters of the taiga in order to ensure a productive hunting season.

==== Ob-Ugrian culture ====
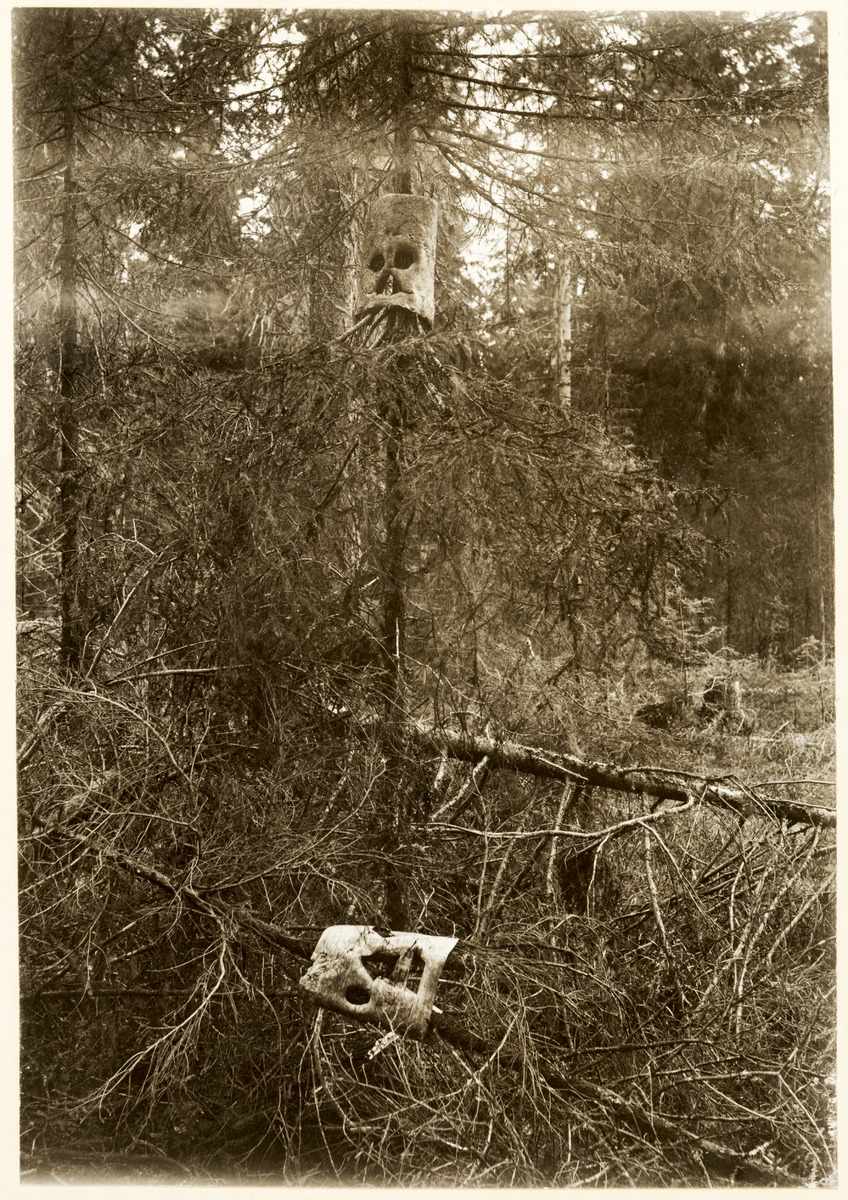
Bear hunting celebration masks left in the woods.

The Ob-Ugrians see the bear as a genetic ancestor. They believe that they have descended from the god Torum, a belief that forms the basis of these peoples’ social relationship with bears, based on a patrilineal kinship.

==== Evenki culture ====
The Evenki however, do not raise the bear before sacrificing it. Similar to the Ob-Ugrians, they see the bear as an ancestor. When they hunt and kill the bear in its den, they must show it respect as well, by “addressing it in kinship terms and asking its forgiveness before preparing its carcass and portioning out the meat for the [bear] feast.” The Evenki, similar to the Nivkh and Oroch believe that other animals have descended from the bear. For example, when any other game is hunted and killed in the forest, this game would then be considered a child of the bear. By honouring and sacrificing the bear through bear ceremonies, these indigenous peoples pay reverence to all animals inhabiting the forest and nature, ensuring fruitful seasons of game to come.

=== Ainu culture ===
The Ainu Iomante ceremony, bear sending, Japanese scroll painting, circa 1870.

The Ainu people, who live on select islands in the Japanese archipelago, call the bear “kamuy” in the Ainu language, which means "god". Many other animals are considered gods in Ainu culture, but the bear is the head of the gods. For the Ainu, when the gods visit the world of man, they don fur and claws and take on the physical appearance of an animal. Usually, however, when the term “kamuy” is used, it essentially means a bear. The Ainu people willingly and thankfully ate the bear as they believed that the disguise (the flesh and fur) of any god was a gift to the home that the god chose to visit.

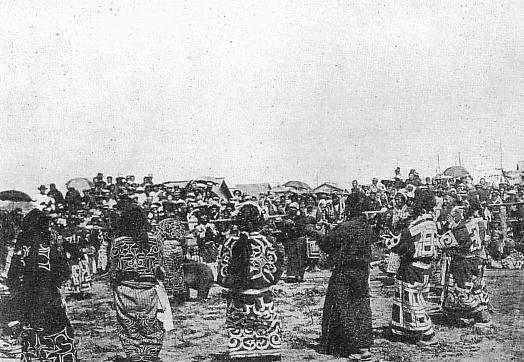
Iomante ceremony

The Ainu believed that the gods on Earth, the world of man, appeared as animals. The gods had the ability to take human form, but only in their home, the country of the gods, which lies outside the world of man. To return a god to his country, the people would sacrifice and eat the animal, sending the god's spirit away with civility. The ritual was called Omante and usually involved a deer or adult bear.

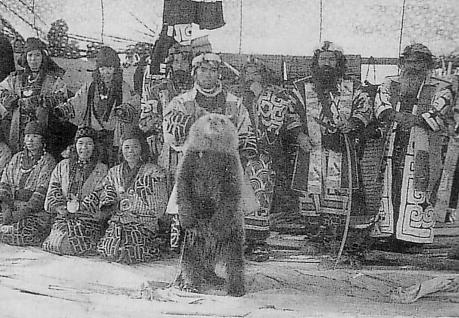
The Ainu Iomante ceremony around 1930.

Omante occurred when the people sacrificed an adult bear, but when they caught a bear cub, they performed a different ritual, iomante in the Ainu language, or kumamatsuri in Japanese. Kumamatsuri translates to "bear festival," and Iomante means "sending off." The Kumamatsuri event began with the capture of a young bear cub. As if he were a child given by the gods, the cub was fed human food from a carved wooden platter and treated better than Ainu children, for they regarded him as a god. If the cub was too young and lacked the teeth to properly chew food, a nursing mother would let him suckle from her own breast. When the cub reached two to three years of age, it was taken to the altar and sacrificed.

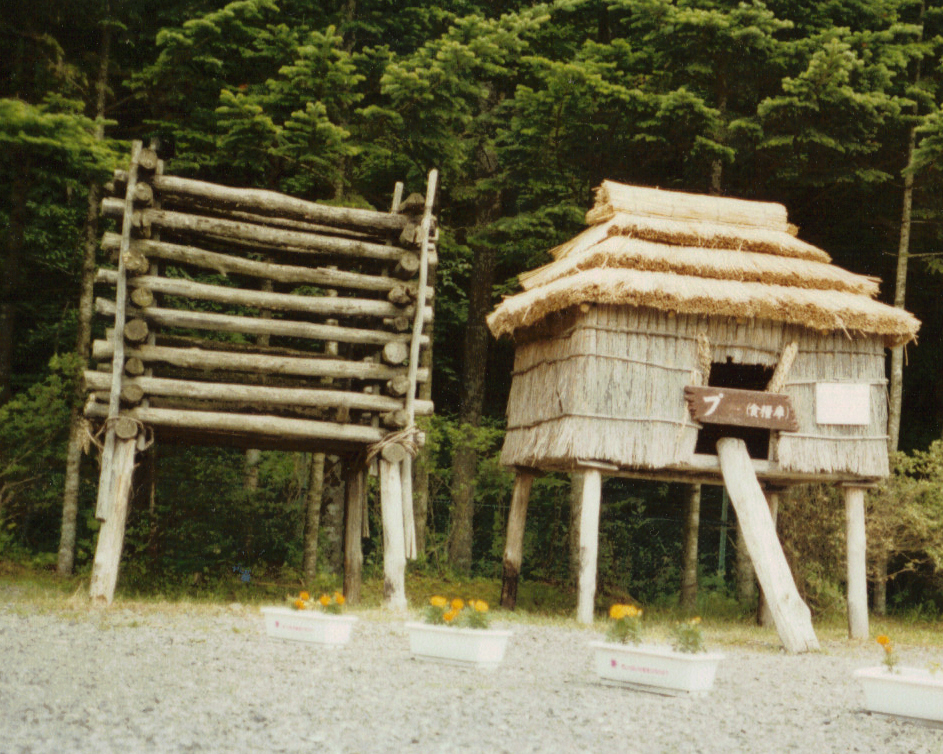
Traditional store house (right) and bear cage (left) at the Ainu Museum, City of Shiraoi, Hokkaido, Japan.

Usually, Kumamatsuri occurred in midwinter, when the bear meat is at its best due to the added fat. The villagers would shoot it with both normal and ceremonial arrows, make offerings, dance, and pour wine on top of the cub corpse. The words of sending off for the bear god were then recited. The festival lasted for three days and three nights to properly return the bear god to his home.

=== Turkic culture ===
In 1925–1927, Nadezhda Petrovna Dyrenkova made field observations of bear worship among the Altai, Tubalar (Tuba-Kiji), Telengit, and Shortsi of the Kuznetskaja Taiga as well as among the Sagai tribes in the regions of Minusinsk, near the Kuznetskaja Taiga (1927). Calling a bear by its true name was believed to summon the bear.

=== Slavic culture ===
Bears were the most worshipped animals of the Ancient Slavs. In Slavic paganism, it is associated with the god Volos, the patron of domestic animals. Eastern Slavic folklore describes the bear as a totem personifying a male: father, husband, or fiancé. Legends about turnskin bears appeared, and it was believed that humans could be turned into bears for misbehaviour.

=== Finno-Ugric culture ===
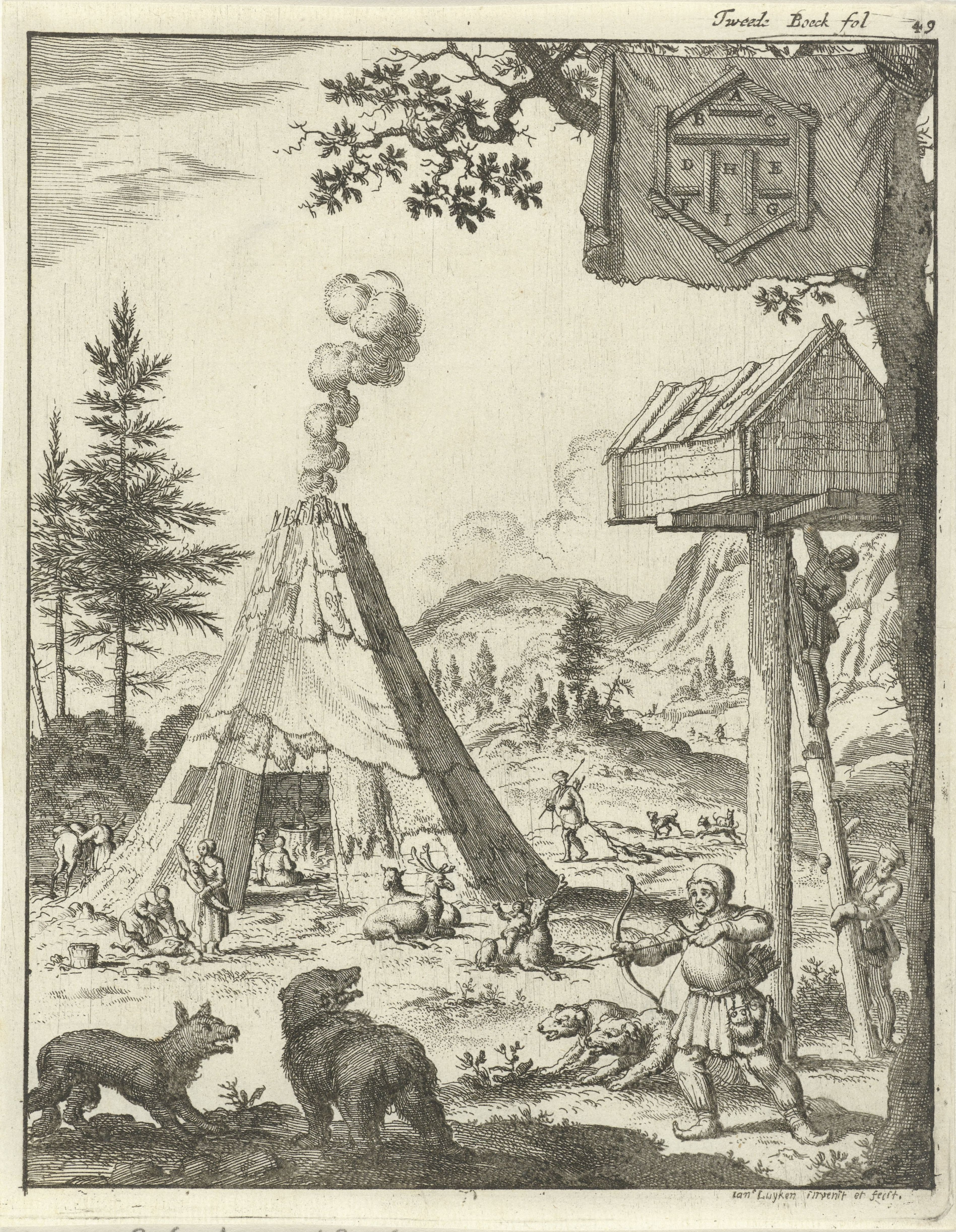
Sámi hunter points his bow and arrow at a wolf and a bear.

In Finnish paganism, the bear was considered a taboo animal, and the word for 'bear' (oksi) was a taboo word. Euphemisms such as mesikämmen 'honey-palm' were used instead. The modern Finnish word karhu (from karhea, 'coarse, rough', referring to its coarse fur) is also such a euphemism. In the Finnish national epic, the Kalevala, the bear is called Otso, which is the sacred king of animals and leader of the forest, deeply feared and respected by old Finnish tribes.

A successful bear hunt was followed by a ritual feast, (Note: Called peijaiset.) with a ceremony in which the bear was an "honoured guest", and songs were sung to convince it that its death was "accidental" to appease its spirit. (Note: Willerslev, Vitebsky, and Alekseyev cited Jochelson 1908 (p. 94) in explaining a similar practice with regards to domesticated reindeer sacrifice, "...it must not be frightened but be a willing victim, otherwise the sacrifice will not be accepted by the spirits," a practice which was similarly done for the killing of other animals.) The bear's skull was raised high in a pine tree so its spirit could climb back into its home in the heavens, and the tree was venerated afterwards.

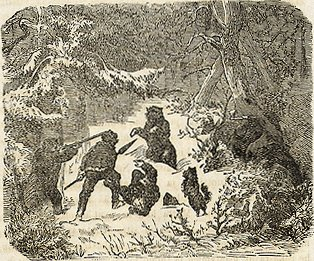
Bear hunting with a spear and dogs.

=== Korean culture ===
According to legend, Ungnyeo (Note: In the legend, (Note: Grayson argued that this is a foundational legend, not a creation myth for Koreans.) the name Ungnyeo (Korean: 웅녀; Hanja: 熊女) literally means 'bear woman' with 웅 (熊) pronounced 'ung' ('néng), which translated to 'bear', and 녀 (女) pronounced 'yeo' ('nyeo'). See Grayson 2015 or Grayson 2001 for the 2001 translation by Grayson of Samgukyusa, or the article Ungnyeo for more information.) was a bear who turned into a woman, and gave birth to Dangun, the founder of the first Korean kingdom, Gojoseon. Bears were revered as motherly figures and symbolised patience.

== See also ==
- Animal worship
- Barong
- Kumaso
- Rock carvings at Alta
- Shardik (a novel by Richard Adams about bear worship)
