= Noisetier Cave =

Cave in France

- Grotte du Noisetier (French)
- Grotte de Peyrère, Grotte de Serrat de la Toue
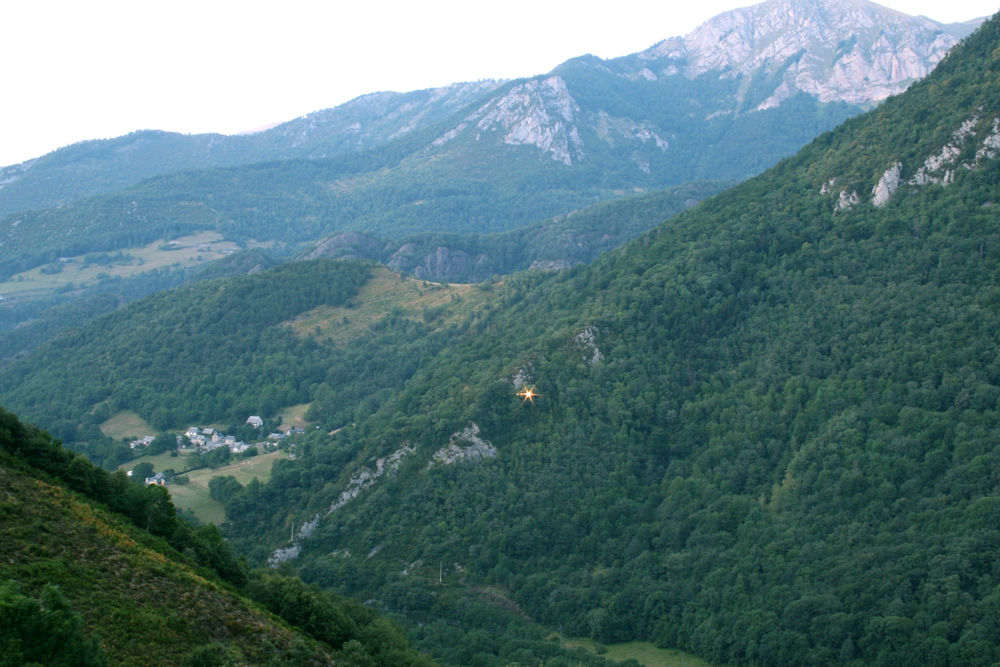
- location in the Upper Pyrenees

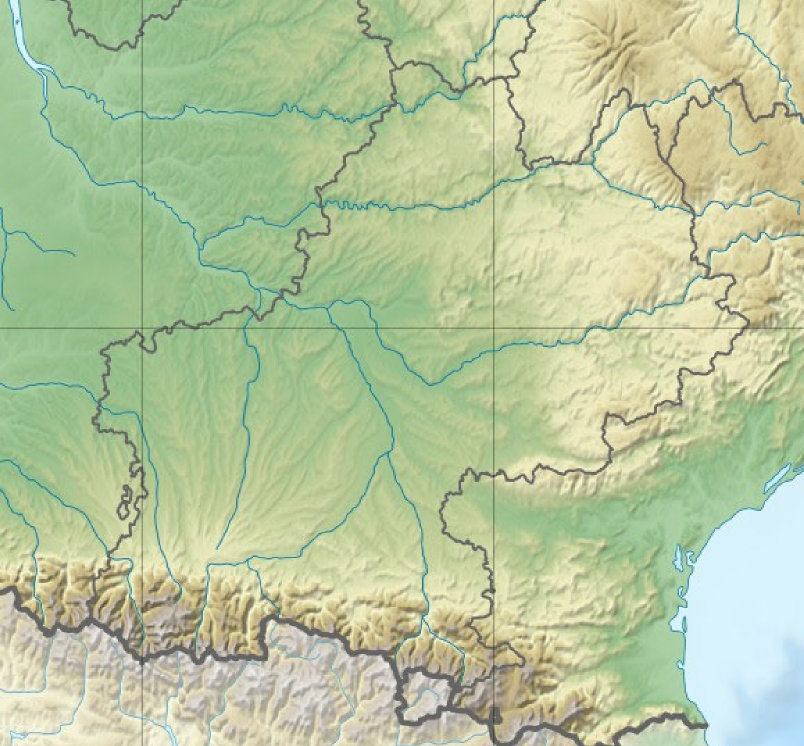
- Location in France Noisetier Cave (France)
- 42°55′40″N 0°22′14″E
- Type: Jurassic limestone
- Periods: Upper Palaeolithic
- Location: Vallée d'Aure, Ardengost commune near Fréchet-Aure village, Lannemezan town
- Region: Occitania, Pyrenees, France

Site notes
- Material: limestone Karst
- Length: 20 m (65.62 ft)
- Excavation dates: 1987, 1992, 2004
- Archaeologists: Michel Allard, V. Mourre, S. Costamagno, C. Thiébaut

The Noisetier Cave (French: Grotte du Noisetier, lit: Hazel cave, also Grotte de Peyrère or Grotte de Serrat de la Toue), owing its popular name to the hazel trees that grow in front of its entrance, is located in a mountainside 145 m (476 ft) atop the Vallée d'Aure in the Ardengost commune, Hautes-Pyrénées department in the region Occitania, Southern France. During systematic excavations since 1992 Middle Paleolithic stone tools and artifacts attributed to the Neanderthal Mousterian culture were discovered among numerous faunal remains.

== Location ==
Sheltered by the Ardengost limestones which rise to 1,450 m (4,760 ft) the cave is located at 825 m (2,707 ft) above sea level on the western slopes and overlooks the Neste d'Aure river valley, a tributary of the Garonne. The cave is a sub-horizontal (Note: not quite horizontal) gallery, oriented north to south and its entrance opens towards the south. It is 20 m (66 ft) long, 3 to 4 m (9.8 to 13.1 ft) in width and 3 to 6 m (9.8 to 19.7 ft) in height.

=== Geology ===
The Grotto is entrenched within the Pyrenean Primary Axial Zone as part of the Ardengost limestone massif, that contains a rich microfauna of foraminifera, brachiopods and polyps and floral (algae) elements. The age of this formation was revised during the 2004 excavation based on this paleontological content and re-dated within the Carboniferous from the upper Visean to the Serpukhovian at around 300 Million years ago. The calcareous particles of these organic components supported the formation of micrite mud, a limestone constituent that enabled the development of the local karst.

== Excavations ==
The presence of paleo-human remains in the cave was first suggested in 1898 by Armand Viré but only in 1985 it was visited again by caver E. Casteret who reported to the Regional Archaeology Service of the Midi-Pyrénées department. An initial survey operation was conducted in 1987 under the direction of Michel Allard in order to investigate the extent and impact of decades of illegal levies. Two field sessions in 1992 and 1993 were undertaken to assess the archaeological significance of the site and to determine appropriate protection measures. The subsequent excavation probe of a few square meters lead to the discovery of several cultural layers, relatively rich in Mousterian lithic vestiges and faunal remains and it was determined to permanently protect the site with a strong barred gate at the entrance. This rescue campaigns's results remained mainly unpublished. In a few brief notes the site is usually presented as a temporary occupation site or hunting camp specialized on chamois (Rupicapra pyrenaica) and ibex (pyrenaica pyrenaica). In 2004, another interdisciplinary research excavation was launched at the site, that lead to a number of new discoveries, in some cases results were contrary to earlier ones. The discovery of juvenile Neanderthal teeth, for example contradicts the hunting camp hypothesis of the site.

=== Dating ===
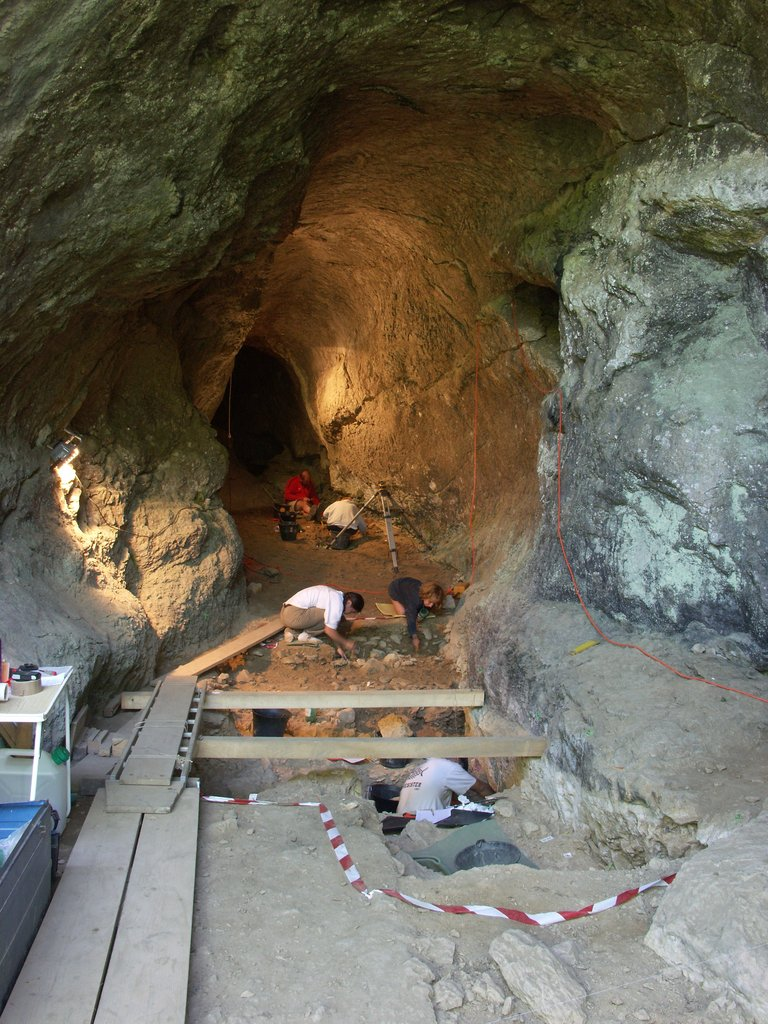

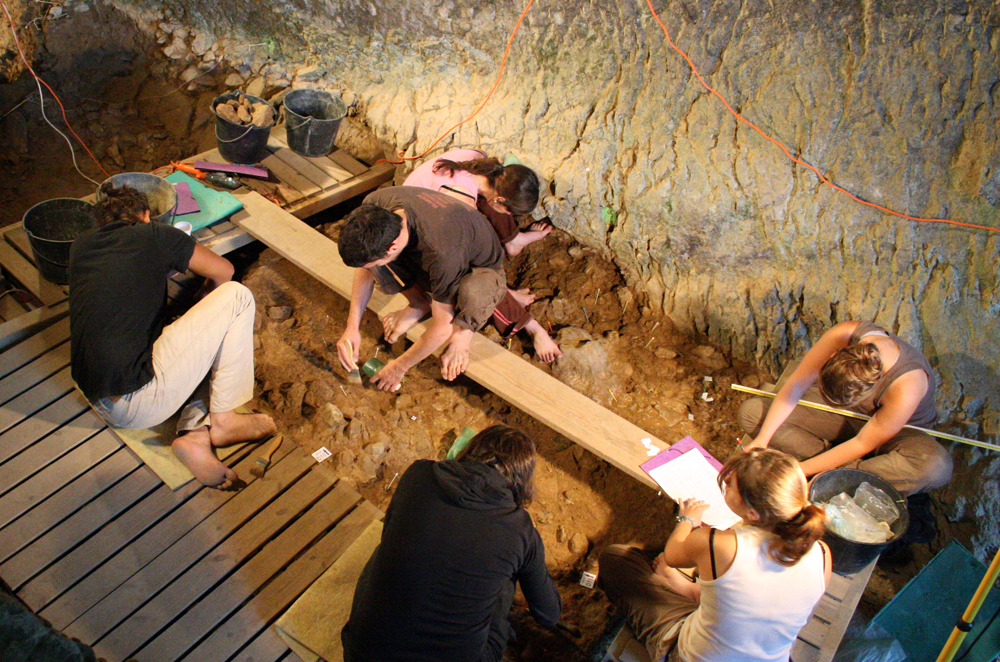
excavation during the summer of 2009

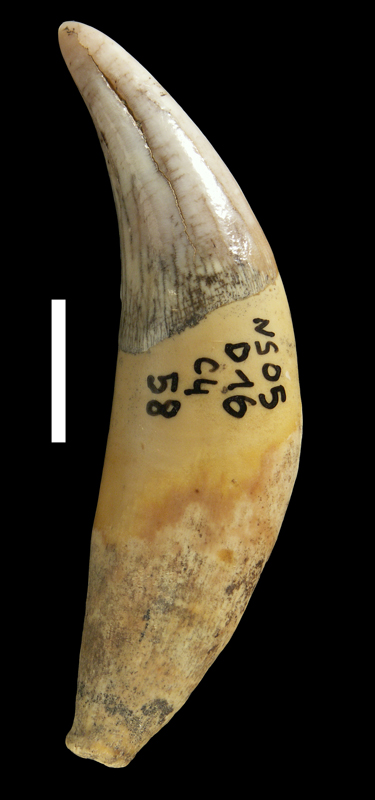
canine of Panthera pardus, scale = 1 cm (0.39 in)

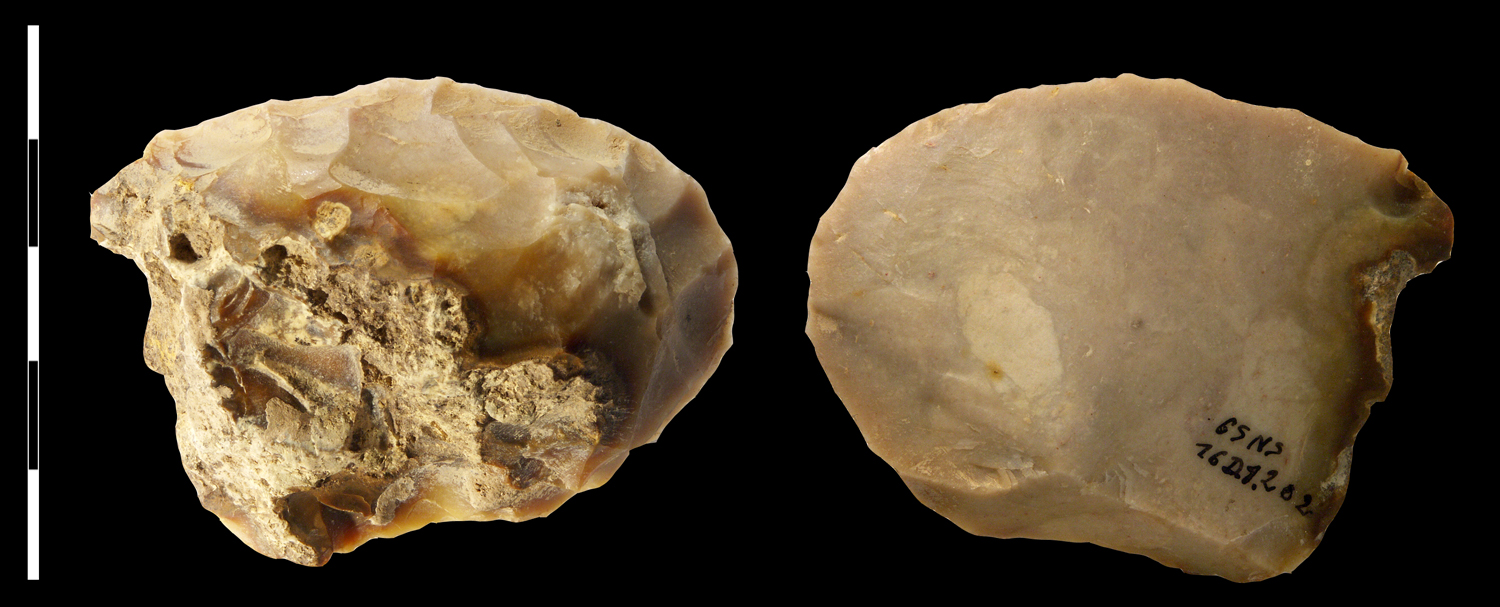
flint side-scraper, scale in cm

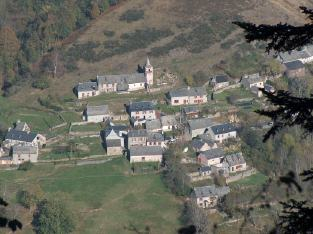
Ardengost village, 17 inhabitants in 2009

Dates, that were obtained by the Carbon-14 dating method indicate a range between of about 30,000 and 50,000 years ago for the entire archaeological sequence. Biochronological data of microfauna and larger animals, similarity association with layers of the Combe-Grenal site allow to propose an allocation of deposits during the interglacial period between the Würm II and Würm III ice ages. Based on AMS radiocarbon dates and biochronological data, the archaeological levels are attributed to a temperate phase of the Oxygen isotope stage 3.

== Stone tools ==
The stone tool industry of local raw materials from the alluvial formations of the Neste river, such as quartzites, lydites, cinerites, and schists is considered to be of a mediocre quality. Flint, as found in the cultural sediments is naturally absent in the immediate environment and must have been imported from several sources. The most exploited flint quarry is the Montagaillard flysch, located 40 km (25 mi) away in the Hibarette community of the Montgaillard region. This flysch flint is of good quality and is found in slabs of different sizes. The presence of Lepidorbitoid fossils in some flints indicates even more distant sources located in the Béarn province, more than 100 km (62 mi) away. Apparently, the flint outcrops of the Petites Pyrénées to the northeast were not used

The tooling is simple and consists mainly of scrapers and denticulates, (Note: hand tools with serrated blades) the execution is often incomplete and irregular. The main production method is the discoid bifacial breakdown. Tools and products of full Levallois (Note: a distinctive type of stone knapping developed by precursors to modern humans during the Palaeolithic period) debitage, debris, by-products and retouching shards are present in large numbers, as are sandstone and granite hammering tools, although in smaller numbers. The Levallois technique is also attested on quartzite, schist or lydite cutting devices, regular parallel surface products and faceted heels. Noteworthy is the discovery of a two-sided cleaver.

== Fossils ==
=== Fauna ===
Noisetier Cave has yielded more than 10,000 fossils of large animals and an additional 80,000 determinable remains of small rodents. Dominant are mountain species, especially chamois (Rupicapra pyrenaica) and ibex (Capra pyrenaica pyrenaica) followed by deer and large bovines. Moderate amounts of carnivore fossils of cave bear (Ursus spelaeus), red fox (Vulpes vulpes), leopard and dhole (Cuon alpinus) are documented.

A taphonomic survey concluded distinct types of large animal bone accumulations by different agents. Red deer (Cervus elaphus) and bovine fossils with butchery marks are extremely abundant while carnivore marks are rare. No deer bone is digested while nearly half of the bones show human interference. Neanderthals account for most of the deer and the bovines and a sizable portion of the chamois and ibex fossils, some of them were secondly scavenged by carnivores. The survey also allows to favor the hypothesis of extraction by Neanderthals of the fat contained in the spongy tissues of deer bones. In chamois assemblages, 482 fossils were investigated and the non-human predation marks interpreted. Bearded vultures (Gypaetus barbatus), that must have occupied the site during Neanderthal's absence accumulated a high percentage of the chamois bones and to a lower degree those of ibex. Dhole (Cuon alpinus) teeth and bones are the most numerous among carnivores. Milk teeth suggest that Cuon alpinus sheltered its offspring at the site. A 2013 study concluded that dholes contributed to the present composition of animal fossils, to which extent remains debated.

=== Microfauna ===
Studies on microfauna, that was very abundant and relatively homogeneous over the entire sequence have, apart from confirming the interglacial climate during the stratigraphic sequence, delivered an independent set of discoveries. From the more than 80,000 remains of rodent species identified, among others were: Arvicola terrestris, Mimomys pyrenaicus, Mimomys pyrenaicus november. sp., Mimomys salpetrierensis, and the Pyrenean desman or muskrat (Galemys pyrenaïcus).

With the discovery of Mimomys salpetrierensis, the former hypothesis of defining the Lower Pleistocene and Middle Pleistocene through the disappearance of Mimomys has been called into question. This also applies to other species, such as Pliomys and Allocricetus, which were thought to have become extinct during the Eemian. Another example is the European adder (Vipera berus) which evolved towards the Baskian viper and now occupies the Cantabrian region and the Pyrenean desman (Galemys pyrenaïcus), found in fossil form at the site. The European water vole (Arvicola terrestris) retained a local enclave whereas the rest of the population turned towards Asia.

Further studies suggested that the Nemausia genus, a nomen nudum is identic with the Mimomys genus. Mimomys pyrenaicus november. sp. was identified as a new species, that supplements the Mimomys lineage between Mimomys salpetrierensis and Mimomys blanci and it also confirms that the Pyrenees served as a refuge for species that are endemic today.

=== Human remains ===
The site has delivered three dental relics. According to morphological and metric traits, these teeth fit in the variability of Neanderthal. The teeth have a significant attrition of the crown and incomplete roots as those of a 5 to 10-year-old child. Depending on the current variability and the fact that they have been discovered in the same sector and in the same level, they could correspond to the same individual.

== Character of the site ==
Questions relating to the function of the site are at the heart of the research carried out since 2004. What were the reasons why the Neanderthal groups wanted to frequent the mountain environment? Marked climatic contrasts and important differences in altitude, the mountain environment is generally regarded as constraining for Paleolithic hunter-gatherers groups. The initial hypothesis of a site linked to a hunting camp for mountain game was put into question. Deer is preferentially being hunted, although this species is not typical for a mountain environment. The presence of human juvenile incisors indicates that the site was not exclusively frequented by groups of adult hunters. The questioning of classical interpretation as a halt of hunting poses more questions than it solves and, in the present state of research, the Mousterian occupation of the grotto finds no simple explanation either. It could have served as a temporary habitat site or stage site to travel to the southern slopes of the Pyrenees or for the exploitation of specific mineral resources, but all that remains difficult to demonstrate. In the current state of research, only hypothesis can be proposed to explain the Mousterian occupation of the Noisetier cave.

== Notes ==
Footnotes

== Bibliography ==
- ^ Jamie L. Clark; John D. Speth (11 July 2013). Zooarchaeology and Modern Human Origins: Human Hunting Behavior during the Later Pleistocene. Springer Science & Business Media. pp. 220–. ISBN 978-94-007-6766-9.
- Aldemaro Romero Díaz (23 July 2009). Cave Biology: Life in Darkness. Cambridge University Press. pp. 50–. ISBN 978-0-521-82846-8.
