= List of Neanderthal sites =

Archaeological sites where remains or tools of Neanderthals were found

This is a list of archaeological sites where remains or tools of Neanderthals were found.

== Azerbaijan ==
- Azykh Cave

== Belgium ==
- Schmerling Caves, Engis
- Naulette
- Scladina
- Spy-sur-l'Orneau
- Veldwezelt-Hezerwater

== Croatia ==
- Krapina Neanderthal site
- Vindija Cave

== Czech Republic ==
- Kůlna
- Šipka

== France ==
- Vaucluse, Bau de l'Aubesier
- Biache-Saint-Vaast
- Bruniquel Cave
- Châtelperron
- Combe Grenal
- Eguisheim
- Grotte du Renne at Arcy-sur-Cure
- La Chaise
- La Chapelle-aux-Saints
- La Ferrassie
- La Quina
- Le Moustier
- Le Regourdou
- Lussac-les-Châteaux, Les Rochers-de-Villeneuve
- Moula-Guercy
- Saint-Césaire

== Germany ==
- Ehringsdorf
- Neanderthal 1, Neander Valley
- Salzgitter-Lebenstedt

== Gibraltar ==
- Neanderthals of Gibraltar

== Hungary ==
- Suba-lyuk, Bükk Mountains

== Iraq ==
- Shanidar

== Iran ==
- Bisitun Cave
- Wezmeh

== Israel ==
- Nahal Amud
- Kebara
- Tabun

== Italy ==
- Monte Circeo
- Saccopastore
- Altamura
- Guattari Cave

== Lebanon ==
- Ksar Akil

== Netherlands ==
- Krijn, Northsea shore

== Poland ==
- Jaskinia Ciemna

== Portugal ==
- Furninha cave
- Abrigo do Lagar Velho (Leiria District)
- Figueira Brava (Arrabida Mountains)

== Romania ==
- Peștera cu Oase
- Peștera Muierilor

== Russia ==
- Chagyrskaya Cave
- Denisova Cave
- Mezmaiskaya Cave
- Okladnikov Cave
- Sukhaya Mechetka

== Serbia ==
- Pešturina
- Velika Balanica

== Slovakia ==
- Gánovce
- Ochoz
- Šaľa

== Slovenia ==
- Divje Babe

== Spain ==
- Abrigo de la Quebrada (Valencian Community)
- L'Arbreda
- Atapuerca Mountains
- Axlor
- Banyoles (Catalonia)
- Carihuela (Andalucia)
- Cova Foradà (Valencian Community)
- Cova Negra (Valencian Community)
- Cueva de Bolomor (Valencian Community)
- Cueva Negra (Region of Murcia)
- El Salt (Valencian Community)
- Roca dels Bous (archaeological site)
- Sidrón Cave (Asturias)
- Sima de las Palomas (Region of Murcia)
- Zafarraya (Granada)
- Cova del Gegant (Sitges)

== Syria ==
- Dederiyeh

== Turkey ==
- Karain

== Ukraine ==
- Kiik-Koba
- Moldova I
- Staroselje

== United Kingdom ==
- Bontnewydd, Llanelwy (Wales)
- Creswell Crags (England)
- La Cotte de St Brelade (Jersey, Channel Islands)
- Lynford Quarry (England)
- Swanscombe Heritage Park (England)

== Uzbekistan ==
- Teshik-Tash
- Aman-Kutan
- Obi-Rakhmat Grotto
