= Combe Grenal =

Cave and archaeological site in France

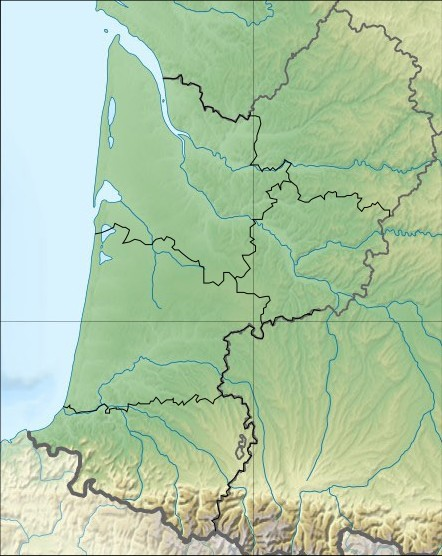
- Location in France Combe Grenal (France)
- 44°48′20″N 1°13′37″E
- Periods: Palaeolithic
- Cultures: Acheulean, Mousterian
- Location: Domme, Dordogne
- Region: Dordogne, Aquitania, France

Site notes
- Excavation dates: between 1953 and 1965
- Archaeologists: François Bordes

Combe Grenal, also known as Combe-Grenal, is an archeological site consisting of a collapsed cave and a slope deposit near Domme, Dordogne in Dordogne, France. It dates back to c. 130,000 to 50,000 Before Present (BP).

First described by François Jouannet in 1812, it was again briefly described by Édouard Lartet and Henry Christy in "Cavernes du Perigord" published in Revue archéologique in 1864. In the 1930s, D. and E. Peyrony did excavations, but the cave was first thoroughly excavated by François Bordes from 1953 to 1965.

The site's stratigraphic sequence is 13 meters in depth and has 64 layers (65 layers in some sources). 55 layers are Mousterian while the 9 layers near the bottom are Acheulean. The oldest layers date back to the end of the Riss glaciation and the youngest to the Würm glaciation.

The oldest Neanderthal remains were found in layer 60. There were also remains found in levels 39 and 35. Most remains are found in level 25, which includes 24 cranial and post-cranial specimens estimated to date to about 75,000–65,000 years BP. In 2009, part of an incisor belonging to a child about three years old (estimate 2–4 years) (Combe-Grenal Hominid 31) was discovered in layer 60. Estimated to be 130,000 years, this is the oldest human fossil in the region Aquitaine.

Archeologist Lewis Binford found that some stone tool cut marks on the jaw remains of reindeer, red deer and horses at Combe Grenal were similar to cut marks on caribous jaws that contemporary Nunamiuts hunted in Alaska. The Nunamiuts made the cut marks in order to remove the tongue, and Binford assumed the Neatherthals left the marks for a similar reason.

Early wood structure perhaps with thatched roof was indicated in Mousterian layers.

== See also ==
- List of Neanderthal sites
- Noisetier Cave
