= Abrigo de la Quebrada =

Archaeological site in the Spanish Province of Valencia

Coordinates: 39.746944°N 0.9975°W

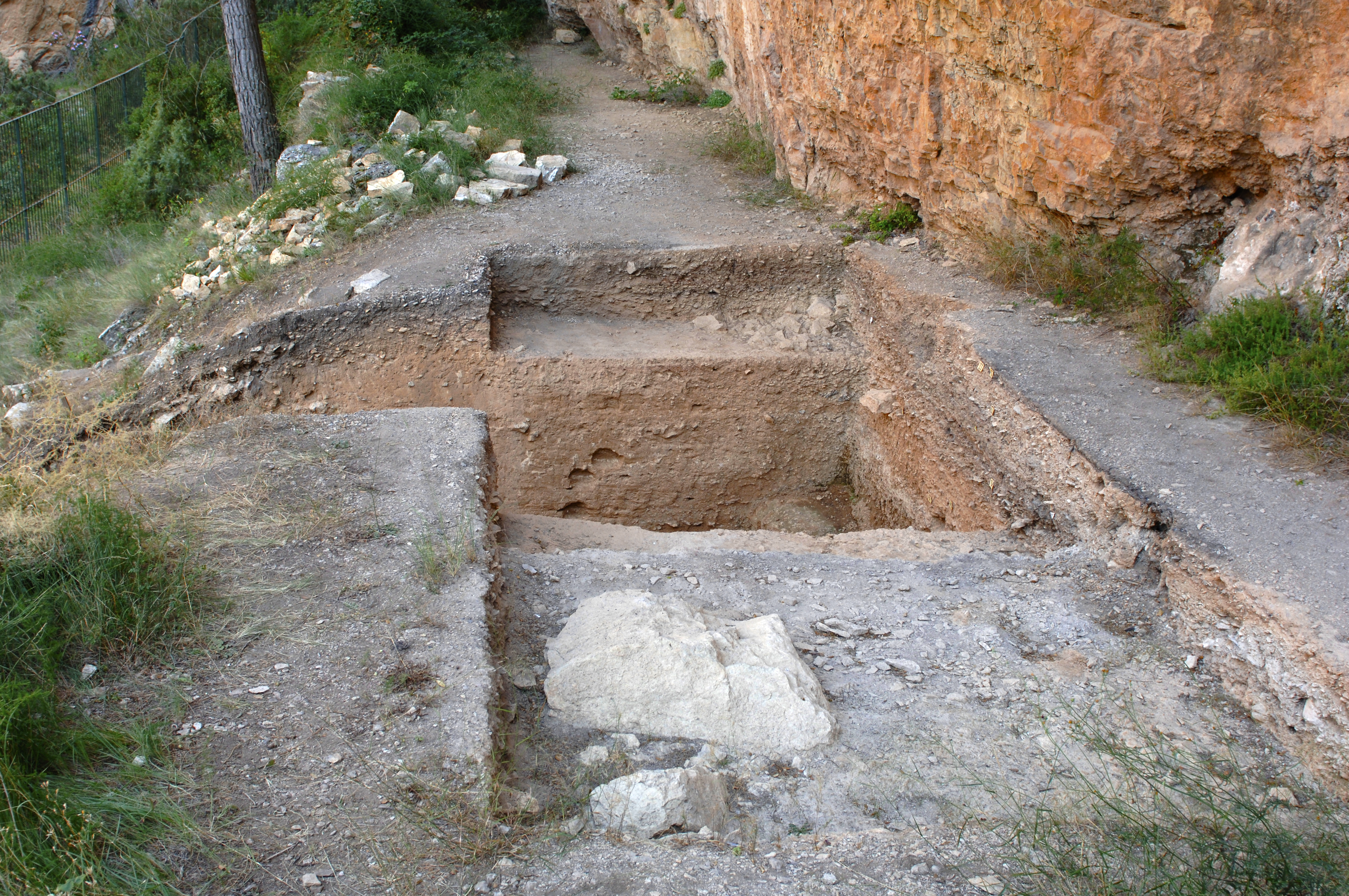
Excavation on-site

The Abrigo de la Quebrada is an archaeological site in the municipality of Chelva, in the Spanish Province of Valencia, ca. 65 km northwest of the city of Valencia. It shows evidence of frequent occupation by Neanderthals.

== Location and description ==
The site is on the left bank of a small ravine, the Barranco de Ahillas; it is a rock shelter between 2 and 9 meters deep, and 38 meters long, facing the northwest. Because of the lack of direct sunshine and its exposure, the site was occupied only from June to October, according to Phytoliths and other evidence, including the reuse and resharpening of stone tools. The area is bordered by two rivers, the Rio Tuejar and the Turia, and two mountain formations, the Sierra de Javalambre (part of the Sistema Ibérico) and the Serra d’Utiel. The site's location, at the entrance of a valley with a dead end, allowed for hunting and trapping large herbivores. The river that (intermittently) runs through the canyon opens onto a plain, and thus the site accessed three different biotopes: the riverside, the mountains, and a plain, so many different kinds of prey could be hunted.

The deposit is around 3 meters thick, and is divided into eight units by archaeologists. The upper layer is disturbed by recent use of the shelter as a sheep pen. There is evidence of human occupation in all but one layer (number 6). Samples of charcoal were dated by way of accelerator mass spectrometry; one sample in level 3 was 40,500 year old, and two samples in level 4 were 43,930 and 50,800 years old.

== Human occupation and remains ==
Flint tools found at the site give evidence of extensive traffic of Neanderthal populations in the area. Occupations in level 4 were frequent and intense, but short term. While much of the flint was procured locally (Domeño), some of it came from over 100 kilometers away; knapping was done also by way of the Levallois technique. Remains of most animals of all four major families (Equidae, Deer, Caprinae, Leporidae) were found, including red deer, ibex, and horse, besides small birds and tortoise. Meat and marrow were eaten.

== Gallery ==
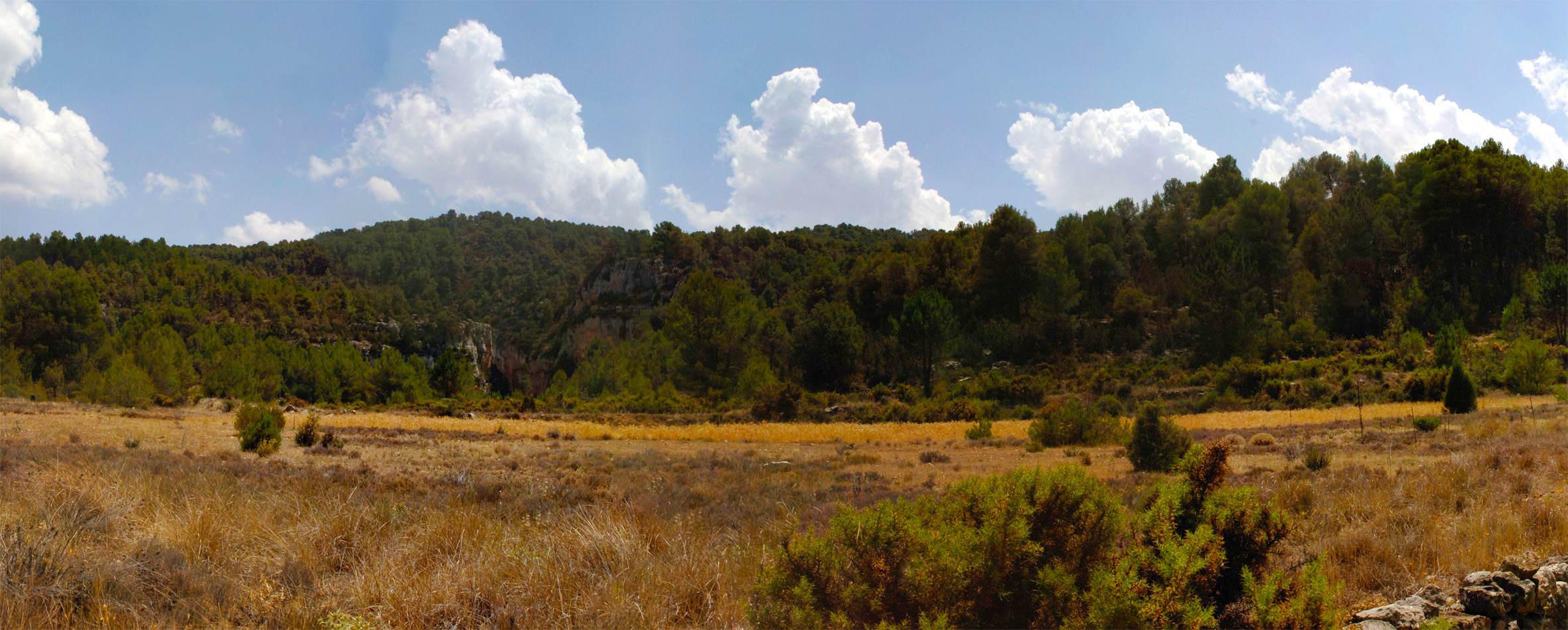
The barranco where the Abrigo de la Quebrada is situated

== See also ==
- List of Neanderthal sites
