= Cova Negra =

Archaeological site in Spain

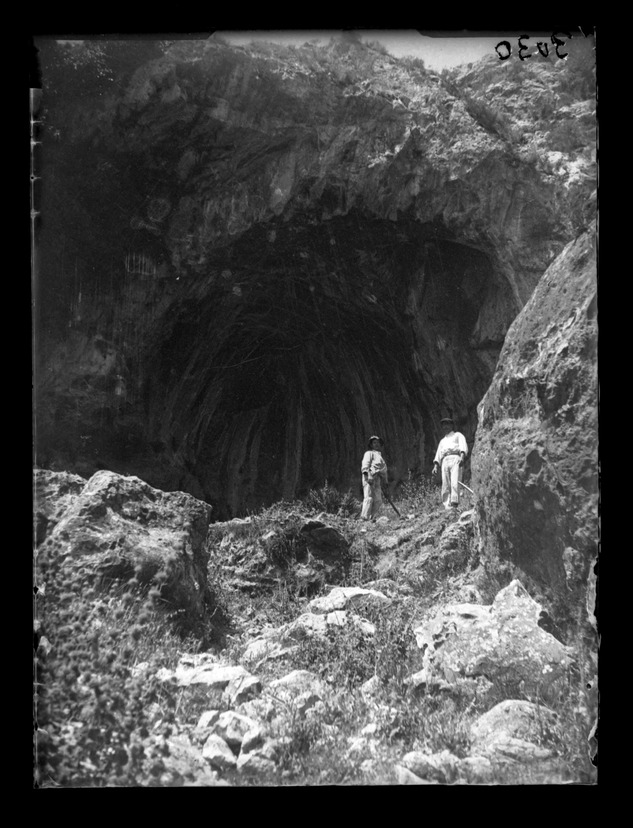
- Cova Negra, 1928
- Interactive map of Cova Negra
- 38.965046°N 0.496271°W
- Type: Intermittent settlement
- Periods: Mousterian
- Region: Province of Valencia

Cova Negra is an archaeological site near the town of Xàtiva in the Province of Valencia, Spain, with remains that show sporadic and short-term occupation by Neanderthals in the Mousterian period.

== Location and description ==
The cave is located in a valley alongside the Albaida river, and an area of 57 hectares around the cave was declared a Cultural Heritage Site. Since 2006 the site is a Municipal Natural Site, also named Cova Negra.

== Archaeological finds ==
The Neanderthals who occupied the area were avid eaters of birds; 247 remains of 18 different bird species were found, especially doves and choughs. Bird consumption in Cova Negra and other caves such as Cueva de Bolomor, Gorham's Cave, and Ibex Cave, prove that the northwestern part of the Mediterranean saw widespread exploitation of "small, fast game".

In 2013, a fragment from an adult parietal bone were found, a cranial fragment from a child, and a child's premolar. By that time, the cave had 25 pieces of Neanderthal remains (seven individuals in all), including many of children (one a teenager, four children). A study carried out in 2019 provided the first ESR / U-Th chronology for the Cova Negra site and indicates that Neanderthals occupied this site during MIS 8–6, between 273 ± 26 ka and 146 ± 34 ka. These results suggest that human occupation took place at the end of the Middle Pleistocene, and hence it is older than proposed by previous thermoluminescence ages obtained on sediments.

== History and research ==
The site was discovered by the priest G. Viñes in 1933.

== Gallery ==
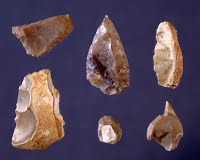
Silex tools found in the Cova Negra

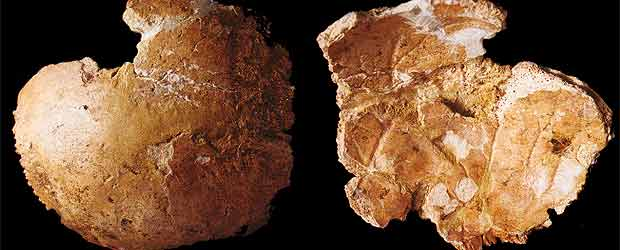
Parts of parietal bone from an adult Neanderthal

== See also ==
- List of Neanderthal sites
