= Nadezhda Petrovna Dyrenkova =

Russian linguist (1899–1941)

- Born: 31 May 1899; Sosninka, Novgorod guberniya, Russian Empire
- Died: 28 October 1941 (aged 42); Leningrad, Soviet Union
- Scientific career
- Fields: Linguistics, Turkology, Folklore studies, Ethnography

Nadezhda Petrovna Dyrenkova (Russian: Наде́жда Петро́вна Дыренко́ва; 31 May 1899 - 28 October 1941) was a Soviet ethnographer, Turkic linguist, and folklorist.

== Biography ==
Dyrenkova was born on 31 May 1899 in the village Sosninka in Novgorod guberniya to a family of lumberjacks.

Dyrenkova died at her desk during the Siege of Leningrad in 1941. She had been ill from a severe sunburn contracted during fieldwork in 1932, and also contracted pneumonia shortly before her death.

Nicholas Poppe included Dyrenkova on a list of 29 outstanding Turkologists.
