= Ardengost =

- Commune
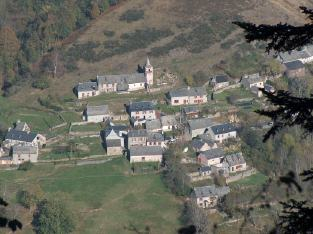
- An overhead view of the village

- Coat of arms
- Location of Ardengost
- Location within France Location within Occitanie
- Coordinates: 42°55′33″N 0°24′18″E
- Country: France
- Region: Occitania
- Department: Hautes-Pyrénées
- Arrondissement: Bagnères-de-Bigorre
- Canton: Neste, Aure et Louron
- Intercommunality: Aure Louron

Government
  - Mayor (2024–2026): Sabine Blasco
- Area^{1}: 5.82 km^{2} (2.25 sq mi)
- Elevation: 1,060 m (3,480 ft)
- Highest elevation: 1,927 m (6,322 ft)
- Lowest elevation: 715 m (2,346 ft)
- Population (2023): 12
  - Density: 2.1/km^{2} (5.3/sq mi)
- Time zone: UTC+01:00 (CET)
  - Summer (DST): UTC+02:00 (CEST)
- INSEE/Postal code: 65023 /65240
- ^{1} French Land Register data, which excludes lakes, ponds, glaciers > 1 km^{2} (0.386 sq mi or 247 acres) and river estuaries.

Ardengost is a commune in the Hautes-Pyrénées department in the Occitania region in southwestern France.

== Population ==
Historical population
Year	Pop.	±% p.a.
1968	23	—
1975	19	−2.69%
1982	19	+0.00%
1990	11	−6.60%
1999	16	+4.25%
2007	16	+0.00%
2012	12	−5.59%
2017	13	+1.61%
2023	12	−1.33%
Source: INSEE

== See also ==
- Communes of the Hautes-Pyrénées department
