= El Salt =

Archaeological site in Alicante, Spain

- Interactive map of El Salt
- 38°41′14″N 0°30′32″W
- Type: Intermittent settlement
- Periods: Middle Paleolithic
- Region: Province of Alicante

Site notes
- Elevation: 680 m (2,230 ft)

Topography of El Salt

El Salt is an archaeological site from the Middle Paleolithic near Alcoy, in the Spanish Province of Alicante, which was frequented by groups of archaic humans for thousands of years. Scientists have found evidence of Neanderthal settlements, including fire pits and flint tools, dating back at least 50,000 years, including six teeth; they disappeared from the site and possibly the Iberian Peninsula some 45,000 years ago. In 2014, the then-oldest known human coprolites were discovered at the site, which revealed that Neanderthals' diets included plants.

== Description ==
El Salt is located close to the confluence of the Polop and Barxell (or Barchell) rivers, minor rivers that are tributaries of the Serpis. It is an open-air rock shelter at 680 (or 700) meters above sea level, one of several site clusters in the plain of Valencia that give evidence of "significant levels of mobility across extended territories" by population groups.

The site has a 6.3 meters thick stratified deposit, at the bottom of a limestone wall, 38 meters high, which is covered with tufa and travertine deposits. Thermoluminescence dating indicated its age is between 60.7 ± 8.9 and 45.2 ± 3.4 Ka. Thirteen lithostratigraphic units are grouped into five different segments; the second contains units IX-XII, containing "horizontally bedded fine sands with abundant archaeological remains and combustion residues". Evidence of campfires are found in abundance in unit X, some 50,000 years old. That unit is up to 35 cm thick, and one of its sub-units (called Xb, 10-14 cm thick and browner, with more clay, than Xa) suggests that the climate at the time of deposit was more humid than today's.

Unit X suggests "several diachronic human occupation episodes and different site functions". Analysis of the coprolites left at the site (the sample had been left on the remains of a campfire) indicated the donor was omnivorous: fats associated with meat consumption were found, but also evidence that the donor had eaten plants.

A study published in 2014 indicates that Neanderthals may have disappeared from the Iberian Peninsula some 45,000 years ago, perhaps 5,000 years earlier than from the rest of Europe.

== History of the research ==
Excavations at the site were done in the 1960s already. Recent excavations have been directed by a research group from the University of La Laguna since 1986, led by Prof. Bertila Galván; it is supported by grants from MICINN/FEDER and the government of the Valencian Community.

== See also ==
- List of Neanderthal sites
