= Le Regourdou =

Cave and archaeological site in France

- Regourdou
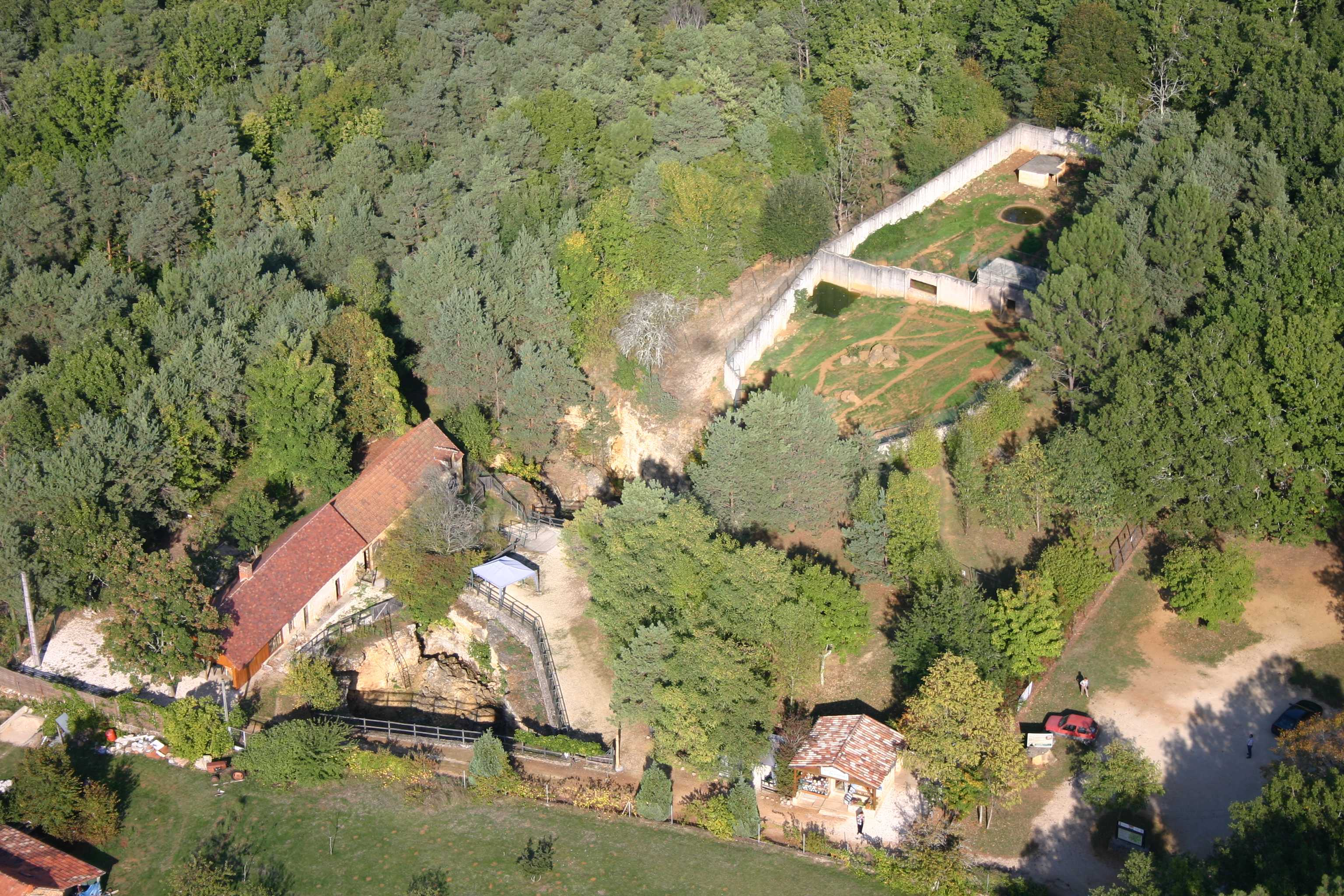
- aerial view of the site

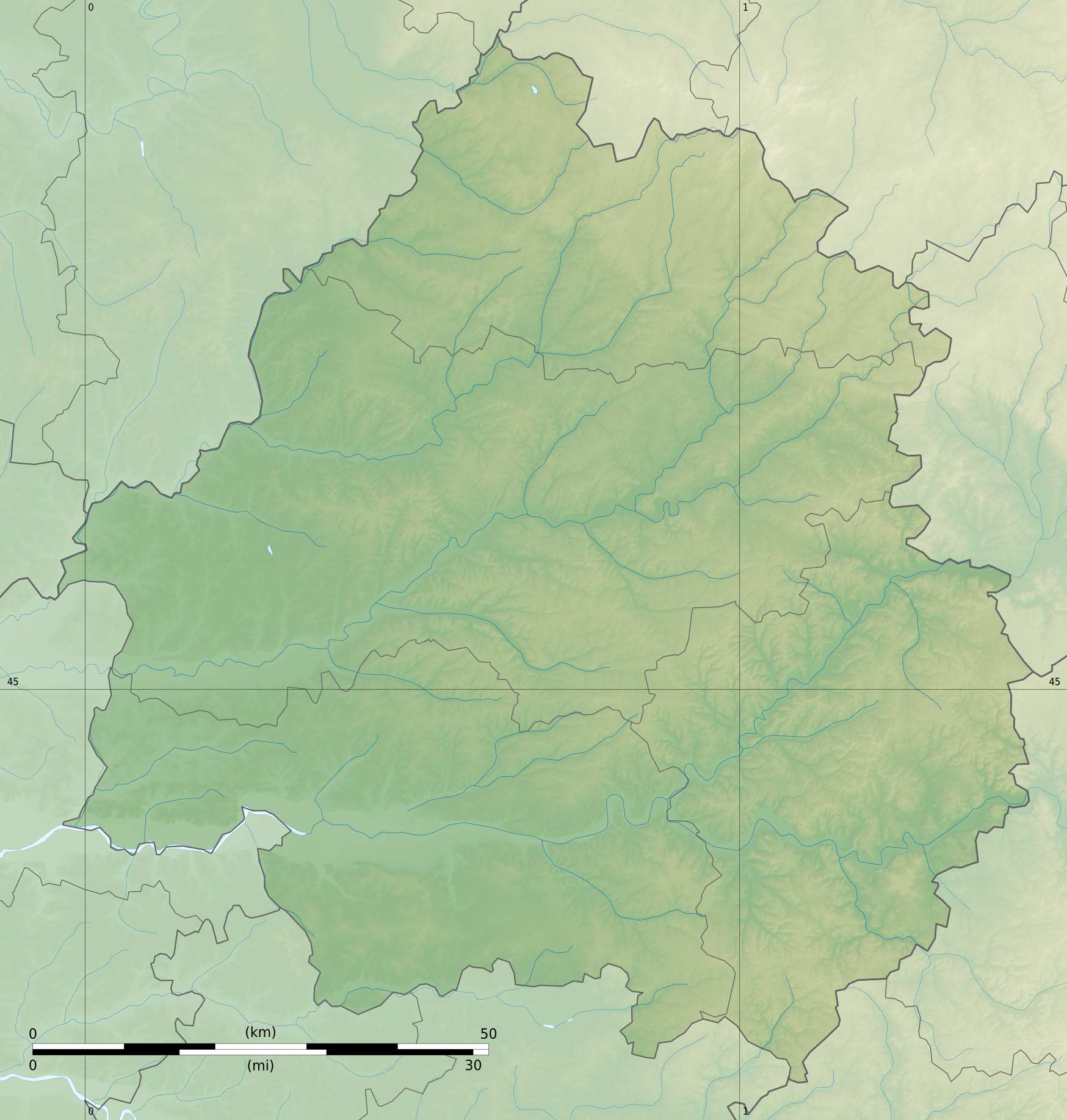
- Location in the Dordogne Le Regourdou (France)
- 45°03′18″N 1°10′40″E
- Periods: Upper Paleolithic, Mesolithic,
- Cultures: Mousterian
- Associated with: Roger Constant
- Location: Montignac, Nouvelle-Aquitaine
- Region: Dordogne department, southwestern France

Site notes
- Length: 23 m (75 ft)
- Width: 11 m (36 ft)
- Archaeologists: François Bordes, Eugène Bonifay
- Discovered: 1954
- Condition: collapsed cave

Le Regourdou (or Le Régourdou) is an archaeological site in the Dordogne department, France, on top of a hill just 800 m (2,600 ft) from the famous cave complex of Lascaux. At this now collapsed 35 m (115 ft) deep ancient karst cavity remarkably well preserved Neanderthal fossils were recovered, that might be skeletal remains of deliberate burials. According to the current excavation team at the site, the correct name of the location is "Regourdou". "Le Régourdou" is considered a misnomer and should be avoided.

== History ==
The site of Regourdou was discovered by chance in 1954 by its owner, Roger Constant. He had seen water being swallowed through a hole into the ground of his farmyard and chose to enlarge it in the hope of discovering another entry to the nearby cave of Lascaux. This cave complex had been discovered in September 1940, after a storm had uprooted a tree that lay above the entrance, thereby causing the collapse of parts of its vault, opening the current artificial entrance. Constant, having noticed a similar collapse in front of his house, considered the event to be related to the Lascaux cave. He started to dig on his own without official approval, found numerous stone tools and on 22 September 1957, he excavated a Neanderthal mandible.

Constant immediately contacted François Bordes, director of the Aquitaine prehistoric antiquities. Bernard Vandermeersch and Eugène Bonifay undertook official excavations from 1961 to 1964 and, among Mousterian artefacts, such as Quina scrapers discovered underneath an 850 kg (1,870 lb) stone slab, what was interpreted as a Neanderthal burial and a brown bear burial. However, like with all other Neanderthal alleged burials, this has been vehemently questioned among experts.

Renewed excavations in 2008 and 2011 lead to the discovery of many more fossils, like the pelvic remains of Le Regourdou.

== Site ==
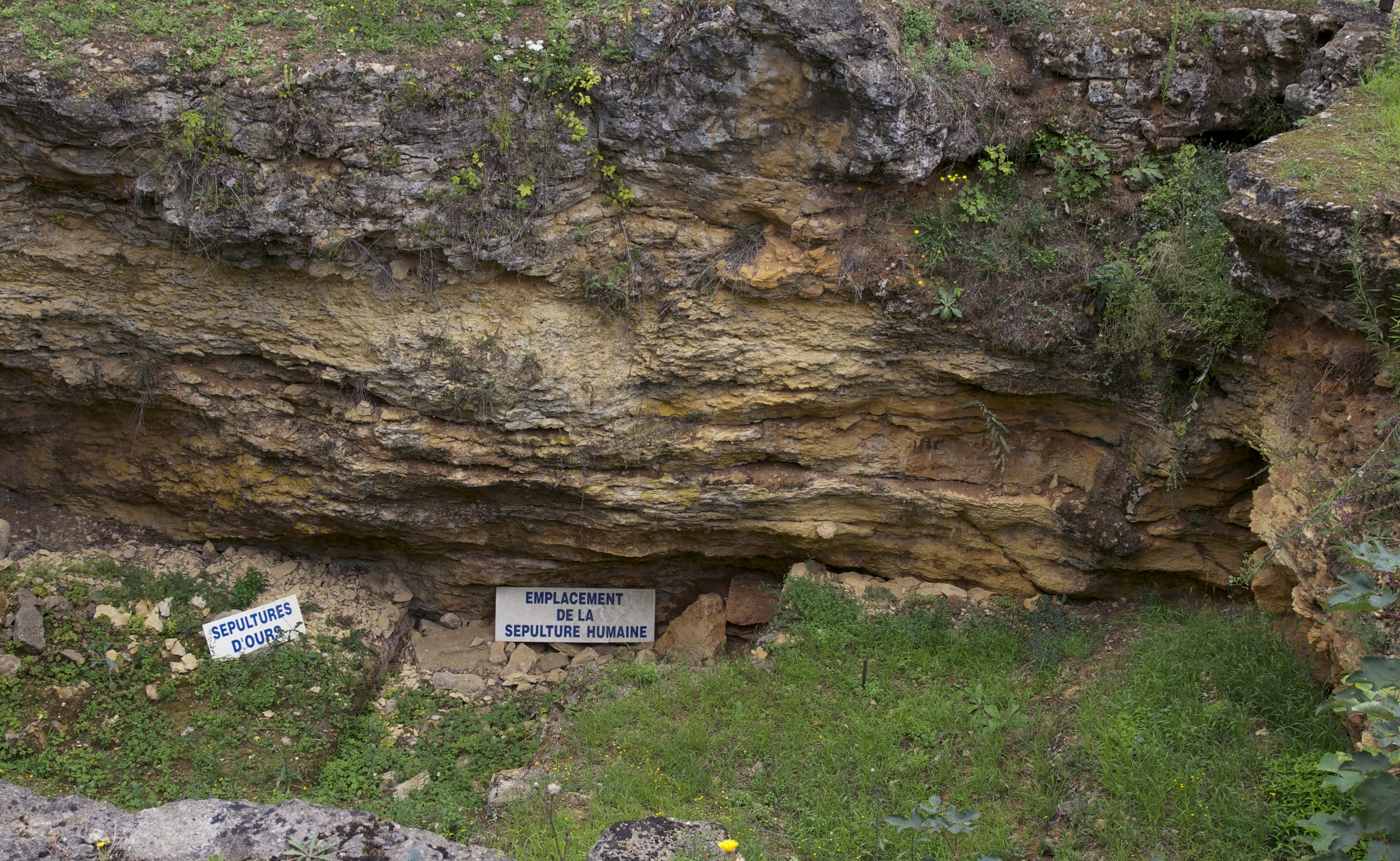
The collapsed cavity

Apart from a Neanderthal skeleton discovered in 1957, excavator Eugène Bonifay found a large number of brown bear bones, several pits and stone platforms that contained bear bones. These were interpreted as evidence of a Middle Palaeolithic bear cult. This interpretation, however, was seriously debated given that repeated occupation of the cave by bears followed natural taphonomic phenomena, that reasonably explain the large number of bones.

The first Neanderthal (Regourdou 1), found at the site is a young adult, that initially preserved the mandible, part of the upper limbs and the sternum. Regourdou 1 has been interpreted as an intentional burial. However, it is difficult to reconcile this with the fact that it has no head and no lower limbs. According to a 2008 publication a great number of skeletal elements were discovered, all in remarkably good condition. These are the right and left coxal, the right femur, the left tibia, the right patella, the left fibula, the right navicular, the bones of the hands and the posterior arch of the lumbar vertebra.

Regourdou 1 is often used for Neanderthal comparison studies, as it is the most robust Neanderthal skeleton ever found. Chronostratigraphic comparison to other sites and biostratigraphy suggest an age of Oxygen Isotope Stage 5 or early Oxygen Isotope Stage 4 (c. 70,000 years BP) for the Mousterian sediment, that contains the burial. A second individual (Regourdou 2) is represented by a calcaneus.

== Shaft cave ==
The shaft cave is the second site that Roger Constant explored. He started digging there in 1970, a few metres from the main site. He used a crane and wagons to extract dirt from the earth down to a depth of 35 metres.
