= Cueva de Bolomor =

Archaeological site in Valencian Community, Spain

- Cova del Bolomor (Catalan)
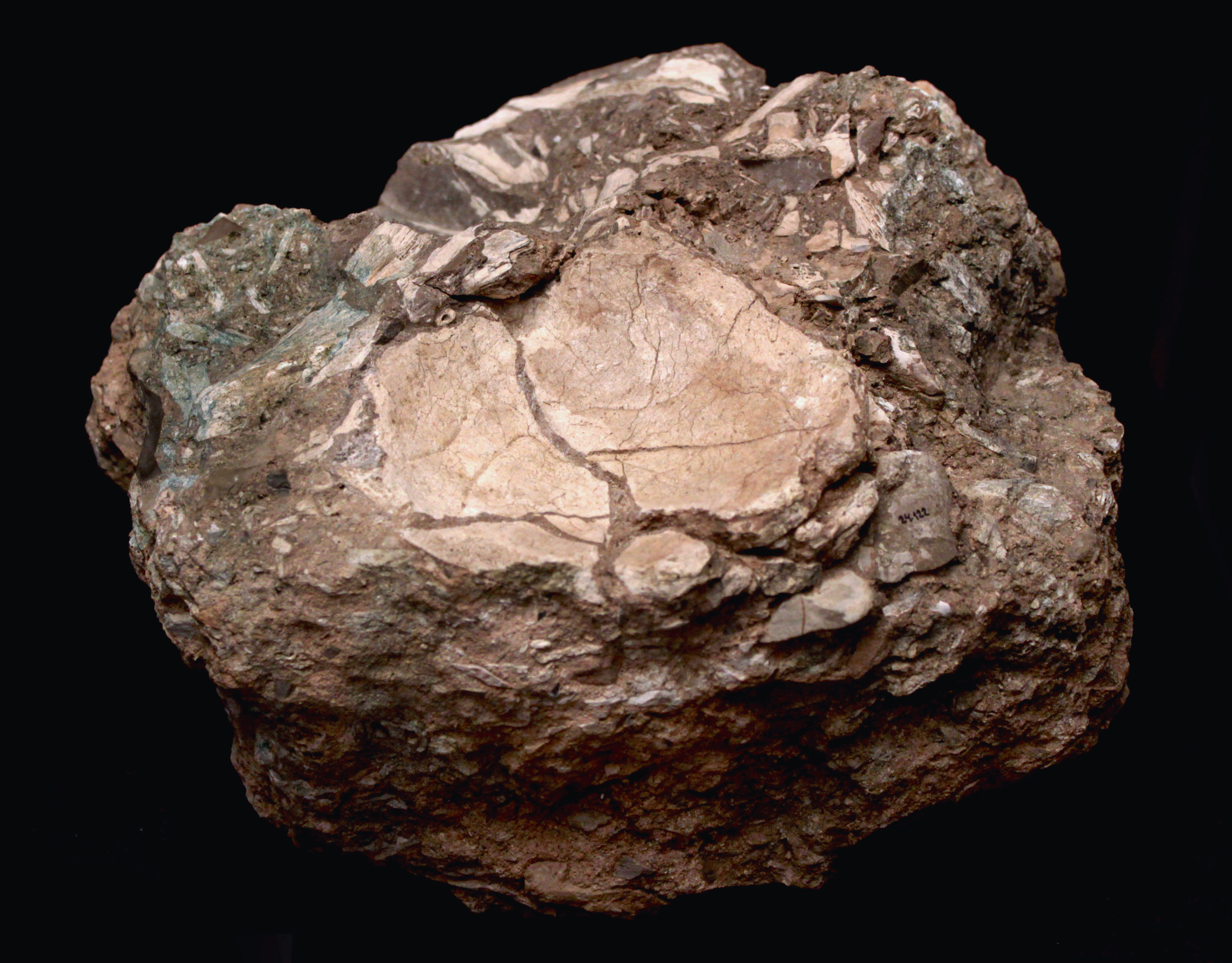
- Parietal fragment of Neanderthal, 130,000 yrs. old

- Location of Cuevas del Bolomor Cueva de Bolomor (Valencian Community) Cueva de Bolomor (Spain)
- 39.0598°N 0.2499°W
- Type: Intermittent settlement
- Periods: late Middle/early Late Pleistocene
- Location: Tavernes de la Valldigna
- Region: Valencian Community

Site notes
- Elevation: 100 m (330 ft)
- Excavation dates: since 1989
- Website: www.bolomor.com/en/

Cueva de Bolomor, or Bolomor Cave, is an archaeological site near Tavernes de la Valldigna in the Valencian Community, Spain. It was occupied over a long period of time, between 350,000 and 120,000 years ago.

Four Neanderthal remains have been recovered in excavations that were begun in 1989: a fragment of a fibula, two teeth, and a nearly complete parietal bone from an adult. All date from the late Middle/early Late Pleistocene. The thickness of the cortical bone in the fibula indicates it came from non-modern man.

== Description ==
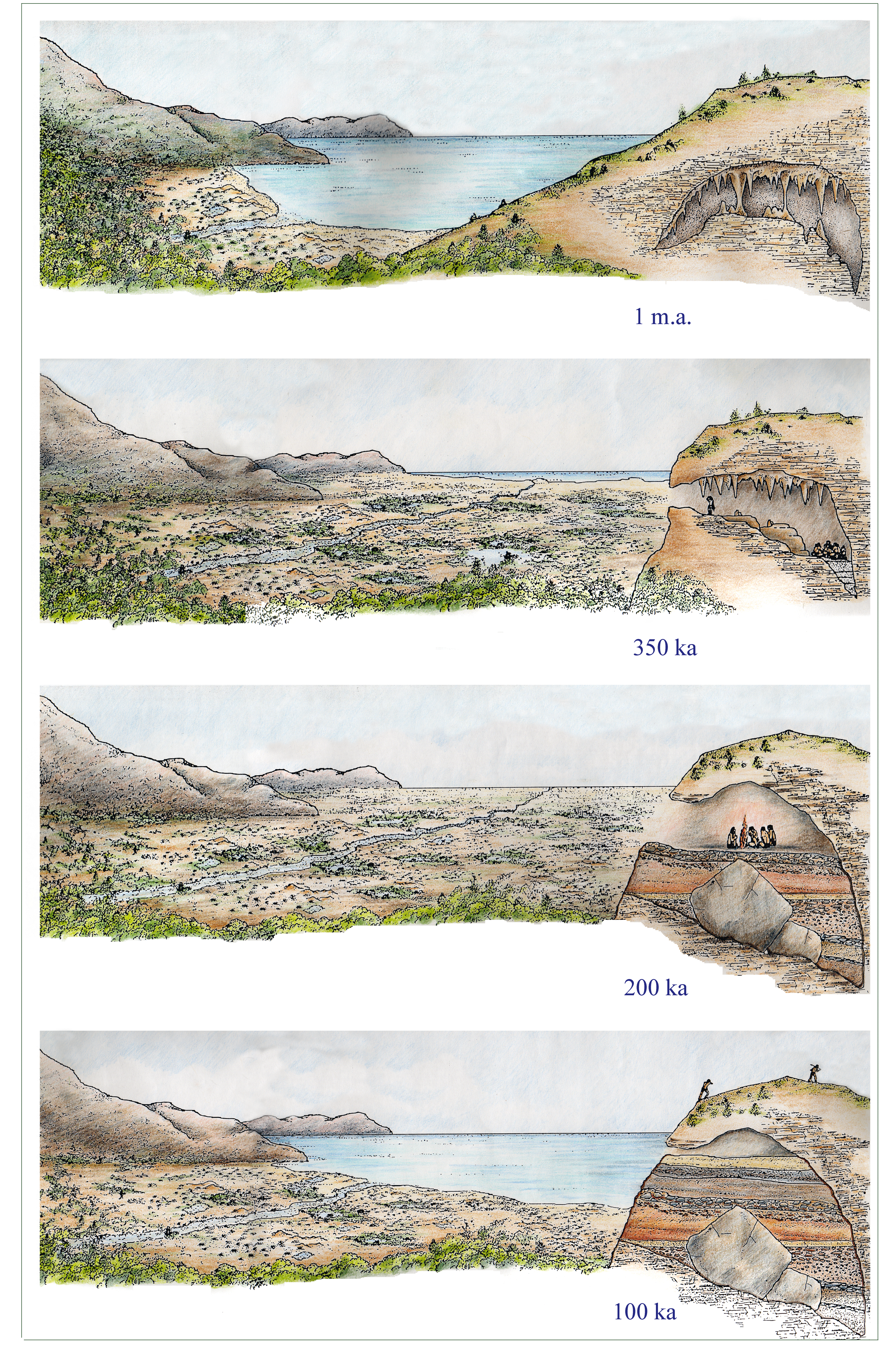
Graphic representation of the history of the cave. Image by Museo de Prehistoria de Valencia.

The cave is located in the La Valldigna valley, which is demarcated by the Les Creus mountain range to the north, whose highly eroded reliefs slope towards the valley, and the Mondúver range to the south. The valley is covered by sediments from the Quaternary period, and opens in the east to a marshy landscape with dunes, which connects to the coastal Mediterranean plain. The Cueva de Bolomor is on the right side of a cliff; it is a karst cave at 100 metres (330 ft) above sea level, surrounded by karstified hills.

The cave today is more a rock shelter, of about 35 metres (115 ft) in length and 17 metres (56 ft) wide, and 20 metres (66 ft) deep with an irregular interior. Formerly, it was a much wider cave, before its dome fell in (probably due to seismic activity). Today's mouth of the cave overhangs the valley and offers a view of the coastal area, including the town of Cullera.

== Occupation and remains ==
Archaeologists recognize a stratigraphy of 17 layers, dated between 350 and 121,000 years ago. Three main periods of occupation are recognized: 350,000 years ago, 200,000 to 150,000 years ago, and 120,000 years ago. Human occupants ate a wide variety of animals, including ungulates of all sizes, besides tortoises and birds. Throughout the occupation, they ate young elephants. A relative rarity for the Middle Pleistocene is the frequency with which the remains of rabbits, marked with cuts, are found; such small, quick prey is unusual for the period, and is most likely a specific feature of a unique locality.

Any prey, including young elephants, would have had to be carried up the steep 100-metre (330 ft) slope. Flake production dominated the flint technology, fire was habitually used, and there was lithic recycling; the Levallois technique was not often used, and no handaxes were found. It is postulated that the site represents a transition from an Acheulean to a post-Acheulean mode of living, which may have taken place between Marine Isotope Stages 9 and 7. Bolomor is one of "numerous European sites [that] attest new technological behavior oriented toward long and complex knapping methods, with long and complex repetitive core reduction, predetermined flake shape, and tool standardization". Layers with scrapers and denticulate tools alternate. Fifteen hearths, in age ranging between 250,000 and 100,000 years old, are being studied. Some of the hearths were lined with stone.

== History of the research ==
The site has been excavated annually since 1989, during a 30-day period. Research is supported by the Prehistoric Investigation Service of the Valencian Council, and the material deposited in the Prehistory Museum of Valencia.

== See also ==
- List of Neanderthal sites
