= 2019 in primate paleontology =

This article records new taxa of fossil primates of every kind are scheduled to be described during the year 2019, as well as other significant discoveries and events related to paleontology of primates that are scheduled to occur in the year 2019.

== New taxa ==
Name	Novelty	Status	Authors	Age	Type locality	Country	Notes	Images
Alophe	Gen. et sp. nov	Valid	Rasmussen et al.	Early Miocene		Kenya	An early Old World monkey. The type species is A. metios.	
Anthradapis	Gen. et sp. nov		Chavasseau et al.	Eocene		Vietnam	A member of the family Sivaladapidae. The type species is A. vietnamensis.	
Aseanpithecus	Gen. et sp. nov	Valid	Jaeger et al.	Eocene	Pondaung	Myanmar	An early member of Anthropoidea. The type species is A. myanmarensis.	
Bownomomys	Gen. et comb. nov	Valid	Morse et al.	Eocene		United States (Wyoming)	An early primate. Genus includes "Teilhardina" americana Bown (1976) and "Teilhardina" crassidens Bown & Rose (1987)	
Cercopithecoides bruneti	Sp. nov	Valid	Pallas et al.	Late Miocene		Chad		
Danuvius	Gen. et sp. nov	Valid	Böhme et al.	Miocene		Germany	A member of the family Hominidae. The type species is D. guggenmosi.	
Homo luzonensis	Sp. nov	Valid	Détroit et al.	Late Pleistocene		Philippines	A species of Homo	
Homunculus vizcainoi	Sp. nov	Valid	Kay & Perry	Miocene	Santa Cruz	Argentina	A New World monkey	
Nanopithecus	Gen. et sp. nov	Valid	Plavcan et al.	Pliocene	Kanapoi	Kenya	A relative of guenons. Genus includes new species N. browni.	
Parvimico	Gen. et sp. nov	Valid	Kay et al.	Early Miocene	Bala	Peru	A New World monkey of uncertain phylogenetic placement. Genus includes new species P. materdei.	

== General research ==
- A study on frequency of insectivory in primates, its possible causes and its implications for the hypotheses of primate evolution from an insectivorous ancestor is published by Scott (2019).
- A study on the evolution of the talus bone in primates, and on its implications for the knowledge of the adaptive origins of crown primates, is published by Yapuncich et al. (2019).
- A study on the expansion in brain mass throughout primate evolution, based on data from extant and fossil taxa, is published online by Melchionna et al. (2019).
- A study comparing mobility and home ranges of members of living and extinct lemur genera is published by Crowley & Godfrey (2019).
- A study on the variability of adapiform humeral elements from Quercy collections will be published by Marigó, Verrière & Godinot (2019).
- A study on the turbinal morphology of Rooneyia viejaensis is published by Lundeen & Kirk (2019).
- A study on the evolutionary history of the New World monkeys (especially on the evolution of their body mass, changes of the mean latitude of their geographic range, and species diversification rates), based on data from extant and fossil species, will be published by Silvestro et al. (2019).
- A study on the relationship between brain size and skull morphology in extant New World monkeys, and on its implications for identifying relatives of howler monkeys in the fossil record, is published by Halenar-Price & Tallman (2019).
- Putative stem platyrrhine Dolichocebus gaimanensis is reinterpreted as a cebine closely related to living squirrel monkeys by Rosenberger (2019), who also considers D. gaimanensis and Laventiana annectens to be congeners.
- A study on the cerebral morphology of Chilecebus carrascoensis is published by Ni et al. (2019).
- A study on the variation in skull and braincase shape of extant and fossil members of the family Atelidae is published by Aristide et al. (2019).
- A study on the catarrhine capitates from the Tinderet Miocene sequence of Kenya, and on their implications for inferring locomotor diversity of Miocene catarrhines from the Tinderet sample, is published by Wuthrich, MacLatchy & Nengo (2019).
- A study on the evolution of the catarrhine hip complex since the Oligocene, based on data from a new femur of Aegyptopithecus zeuxis from the Jebel Qatrani Formation (Egypt), is published by Almécija et al. (2019).
- A revision of fossils of Mesopithecus from the late Turolian Dytiko localities (Axios Valley, Greece) is published by Koufos (2019).
- A study on phylogenetic relationships and evolutionary history of macaques, as indicated by mitochondrial genome and fossil data, is published by Roos et al. (2019).
- A study on the inner anatomy of a skull and teeth of a fossil baboon from the early Pleistocene deposits of the Australopithecus sediba-bearing site of Malapa (South Africa), which might represent the earliest fossil record of Papio angusticeps and consequently, of the modern baboon reported so far, is published by Bouchet et al. (2019).
- Two teeth of a primate belonging or related to the genus Paradolichopithecus are described from the Villafranchian of the Ridjake site (Serbia) by Radović et al. (2019).
- New hominoid canine and incisor specimens, including probable teeth of Kamoyapithecus hamiltoni and teeth of a second taxon, likely related to Nyanzapithecus pickfordi, are described from the Oligocene site of Losodok (Turkana Basin, northwestern Kenya) by Hammond, Foecke & Kelley (2019).
- Description of new fossil material of apes from the early Miocene site of Moroto II (Uganda) and study on the implications of these fossil for the taxonomic attribution of ape fossil material from this site is published by MacLatchy et al. (2019).
- Previously undescribed petrosal bone of Nacholapithecus kerioi from the earliest Middle Miocene of Kenya is reported by Kunimatsu et al. (2019), who evaluate the implications of their finding for the knowledge of the phylogenetic placement of Nacholapithecus and of the evolution of positional behavior of apes.
- A study on the diversification of skull size and shape in hominid (especially hominin) evolutionary radiations, based on data from extant and fossil taxa, is published by Rocatti & Perez (2019).
- A study comparing the prevalence of tertiary dentine in extant gorillas and chimpanzees and in fossil hominins Australopithecus africanus, Homo naledi and Paranthropus robustus is published by Towle (2019).
- A study comparing the trabecular structure in the first metatarsal bone in extant large apes and humans and in fossil hominins from Swartkrans (South Africa), and evaluating its implications for the knowledge of the locomotor behavior of fossil hominins, is published by Komza & Skinner (2019).
- A study on the variation of shape of the third metacarpal bone of apes performing different locomotor behaviors and on its implications for the knuckle-walking hypothesis for human evolution, based on data from extant apes and Australopithecus afarensis, is published by Rein (2019).
- A study on the ontogenetic variation in the thoracolumbar transition in the skeletons of juvenile and adult great apes, humans and fossil hominins is published by Nalley et al. (2019).
- A study on brain blood flow rates in extant great apes, aiming to determine brain blood flow rates in australopithecine human relatives, is published by Seymour et al. (2019).
- A study on the femoral neck cortical bone distribution in Dryopithecus fontani, evaluating its implications for the knowledge of the locomotor behavior of this species, is published by Pina et al. 2019).
- Agustí et al. (2019) report fossil evidence from the Udabno site in eastern Georgia, which they interpret as indicating the survival of Dryopithecus garedziensis (=Udabnopithecus garedziensis) in Caucasus for almost 2 million years after the extinction of the dryopithecines in Western Europe.
- A study on the anatomy of the face and maxilla of Ouranopithecus macedoniensis is published by Ioannidou et al. (2019).
- New maxilla of a member or a relative of the genus Khoratpithecus is described from the late Miocene sediments in Nakhon Ratchasima Province (Thailand) by Chaimanee et al. (2019).
- A molar attributable to Sivapithecus is described from the Miocene of the Ramnagar area (Jammu and Kashmir) by Gilbert et al. (2019), who also study the metric variation of ape molars and premolars from the Ramnagar area and from the Pothohar Plateau Chinji Formation, and attempt to determine the taxonomic diversity of known Ramnagar and Chinji hominoid specimens.
- A study on the phylogenetic relationships of Gigantopithecus, based on data from proteome sequences retrieved from tooth enamel, is published by Welker et al. (2019).
- Isolated fossil orangutan teeth are described from the Late Pleistocene Tham Prakai Phet site (Thailand) by Filoux & Wattanapituksakul (2019).
- A study on the affinities of the hominid fossils from the Early to Middle Pleistocene deposits of Java, Indonesia is published by Zanolli et al. (2019).
- A study on a possible diagnostic tooth pattern of orangutans, evaluating its implications for the taxonomic identification of isolated hominid teeth from the Pleistocene of Asia, is published by Ortiz et al. (2019).
- A study on tooth enamel thickness and development of teeth in juvenile individuals of Rudapithecus hungaricus is published by Smith et al. (2019).
- Description of a partial pelvis from Rudabánya (Hungary), attributed to Rudapithecus hungaricus, and a study on the implications of this finding for the knowledge of the body posture of R. hungaricus and for the knowledge of the ancestral anatomy of the hominin pelvis, is published by Ward et al. (2019).
- A digital reconstruction of the skull of Rudapithecus hungaricus is presented by Gunz et al. (2019).
- A study on the pelvic and lumbar anatomy of Oreopithecus bambolii is published online by Hammond et al. (2019).
- A study on genomes of extant bonobo and chimpanzee populations, presenting evidence for an ancient admixture event between bonobos and an extinct great ape population, is published by Kuhlwilm et al. (2019).
- A study on thoracic and lumbar vertebrae of living humans and chimpanzees and fossil hominins, evaluating the implications of their anatomy for the hypothesis that human individuals whose vertebrae are more similar in shape to the vertebrae of the extinct hominins have a greater propensity to develop the intervertebral disc herniation, is published by Plomp et al. (2019).

== General paleoanthropology ==
- A study on the phylogenetic relationships of fossil hominins is published by Parins-Fukuchi et al. (2019), who find support for directly ancestral relationships in multiple hominin lineages.
- A review of anatomical differences between extant ape and human foot bones, as well as a review of the hominin foot fossil record, is published by DeSilva et al. (2019), who also conduct a cladistics analysis on hominin foot fossils.
- A study on modern and fossil mammal herbivore communities from eastern Africa spanning the last ~7 million years, aiming to determine whether modern herbivore communities are suitable analogs for the ancient ecosystems in which early hominins evolved, is published by Faith, Rowan & Du (2019).
- A study on the geographic distribution pattern of early hominin fossil occurrences over time, evaluating its implications for the knowledge of the relevance of the coastal forest in eastern Africa along the Indian Ocean for early hominin evolution, is published by Joordens et al. (2019).
- A study on the behavioral evolution in Plio-Pleistocene hominins, as inferred from archaeological data and comparison with extant hamadryas baboons, is published by Swedell & Plummer (2019).
- A study on a child tooth found in Wezmeh Cave, Iranian Zagros by Zanolli et al. (2019) revealed that it belongs to a Neanderthal.
- A study on the diversity and the environments of hominins in the early Pleistocene of the Omo-Turkana Basin (East Africa) is published by Bobe & Carvalho (2019).
- A study comparing ages at death of hominin specimens from the early Pleistocene sites of Drimolen and Swartkrans, and on their implications for inferring mechanisms of hominin skeletal accumulation at these sites, is published by Riga et al. (2019).
- A revision of Middle Pleistocene faunal record from archeological sites in Africa, and a study on its implications for inferring potential links between hominin subsistence behavior and the Early Stone Age/Middle Stone Age technological turnover, is published by Smith et al. (2019).
- A study on Acheulean and Middle Stone Age sites from the Eastern Desert (Sudan), preserving stone artifacts, is published by Masojć et al. (2019), who interpret these sites as evidence of green corridor or corridors across Sahara which made early hominin dispersal possible.
- A study aiming to determine skull morphology of the last common ancestor of all modern humans, and comparing it with skulls of Late Middle Pleistocene African hominins, is published by Mounier & Mirazón Lahr (2019).
- Description of new fossil material of Ardipithecus ramidus from the Gona Project study area (Ethiopia), providing new information on the locomotor pattern and the anatomy of the hand of this species, is published by Simpson et al. (2019).
- A study on the phylogenetic relationships of Ardipithecus ramidus is published by Mongle, Strait & Grine (2019).
- A study on the morphology and morphometric affinities of the foot of Ardipithecus ramidus, evaluating its implications for the knowledge of likely anatomy of the foot of the chimpanzee–human last common ancestor, is published by Prang (2019).
- A study on the age of hominin fossils representing the genera Australopithecus, Paranthropus and Homo from the Cradle of Humankind in South Africa is published by Pickering et al. (2019); the study is subsequently criticized by Hopley et al. (2021).
- A study on calcium isotopic patterns in tooth enamel of Australopithecus africanus, Paranthropus robustus and early members of the genus Homo from South Africa, evaluating their implications for the knowledge of nursing behavior of these hominins, is published by Tacail et al. (2019).
- A study on cross-sectional geometric properties of three humeri of specimens of Paranthropus boisei, and on their implications for inferring the function of upper limbs of P. boisei, is published by Lague et al. (2019).
- A study on the surface modifications of the postcranial remains of the Paranthropus boisei specimen OH80 from the Olduvai Gorge (Tanzania) is published by Aramendi et al. (2019), who consider it most likely that this specimen was consumed by carnivores (probably felids).
- A study on defects in the teeth of specimens of Paranthropus robustus, interpreted as possible evidence that members of this species were affected by amelogenesis imperfecta, is published by Towle & Irish (2019).
- A study on the anatomy of the inner ear of the Paranthropus specimen DNH 22 from Drimolen (South Africa) is published by Beaudet (2019).
- A study on the cortical bone distribution along the entire femoral neck compartment of Paranthropus robustus is published by Cazenave et al. (2019).
- A study on the anatomy of the braincase of the Australopithecus specimen Stw 573 ("Little Foot"), and on its significance for inferring the course of the evolution of the hominin brain, is published by Beaudet et al. (2019).
- A study on the anatomy of the bony labyrinth of the Australopithecus specimen Stw 573 is published by Beaudet et al. (2019).
- Description of upper and lower long limb bones of the Australopithecus specimen Stw 573 is published by Heaton et al. (2019).
- Description of the anatomy of the skull of the Australopithecus specimen Stw 573 is published by Clarke & Kuman (2019).
- A study on the diet of Australopithecus anamensis is published by Quinn (2019).
- Fossils of Australopithecus anamensis constituting the oldest known axial remains of Australopithecus are described from the Assa Issie locality (Middle Awash, Ethiopia) by Meyer & Williams (2019).
- A nearly complete hominin cranium assigned to the species Australopithecus anamensis is described from Woranso-Mille (Ethiopia) by Yohannes Haile-Selassie et al. (2019); a study on the age of this specimen and on the environment it lived in is published by Saylor et al. (2019).
- Perspectives on the validity of the species name Australopithecus prometheus and its availability for use are published by Berger & Hawks (2019) and Clarke (2019).
- A study on the postnatal brain growth in Australopithecus afarensis and Australopithecus africanus is published by Cofran (2019).
- Two mandibles of juvenile hominins belonging to the species Australopithecus afarensis are described from the Pliocene Woranso-Mille site (Ethiopia) by Yohannes Haile-Selassie and Timothy Ryan (2019).
- A study on the origination and extinction dates of members of the Australopithecus anamensis–afarensis lineage from eastern Africa, aiming to determine whether these hominins overlapped temporally with Ardipithecus ramidus and/or earliest members of the genus Homo, is published online by Du et al. (2019).
- A study on hominin fossils from Sterkfontein attributed to Australopithecus africanus, aiming to determine whether this fossil material is more likely to represent one or several species, is published by Grine (2019).
- Trace-element analysis of two specimens of Australopithecus africanus from Sterkfontein Member 4 (South Africa) is conducted by Joannes-Boyau et al. (2019), who evaluate the implications of their findings for the knowledge of the dietary cycles and ecological behaviours of members of this species.
- A study comparing temporal ranges of Australopithecus sediba and early members of the genus Homo and evaluating whether A. sediba is likely to be the ancestor of members of the genus Homo is published by Andrew Du and Zeresenay Alemseged (2019).
- A study on pneumatization of temporal bone in the holotype specimen of Australopithecus sediba, comparing it with temporal bones of other African hominins and evaluating whether it can be considered a Homo-like feature of the skeleton of A. sediba, is published by Balzeau (2019).
- A study on the anatomy of the birth canal and the birth process of Australopithecus sediba is published by Laudicina, Rodriguez & DeSilva (2019).
- An assemblage of systematically flaked stone tools dated to between 2.61 and 2.58 Ma, interpreted as the earliest Oldowan tools discovered so far, is reported from Ledi-Geraru (Ethiopia) by Braun et al. (2019); the study is subsequently criticized by Sahle & Gossa (2019).
- A nearly complete set of permanent mandibular teeth of an early member of the genus Homo is described from the upper Burgi Member of the Koobi Fora Formation (Ileret, Kenya) by Grine et al. (2019).
- A study on a dietary shift in early members of the genus Homo from East Turkana in northern Kenya, as indicated by carbon and oxygen isotopic data, is published by Patterson et al. (2019).
- A study comparing the mandibular molar root morphology of Homo naledi with those of African and Eurasian Plio-Pleistocene fossil hominins is published by Kupczik, Delezene & Skinner (2019).
- Description skull remains of Homo naledi from the Lesedi Chamber of the Rising Star Cave system (South Africa) that preserve diagnostic morphology is published by de Ruiter et al. (2019).
- A study on the neck and shaft cross-sectional structure of the femoral fossils of Homo naledi recovered in the Dinaledi Chamber of the Rising Star Cave system is published by Friedl et al. (2019).
- Description of three new femoral specimens of Homo naledi from the Lesedi Chamber of the Rising Star Cave system is published by Walker et al. (2019).
- A study on the anatomy of upper limb fossils of Homo naledi from the Lesedi Chamber of the Rising Star Cave system is published by Feuerriegel et al. (2019).
- A study comparing the deciduous teeth of Homo naledi and other hominins is published by Bailey et al. (2019).
- A study on the relative fibular/tibial strength of Turkana Boy and of Olduvai Hominid number 35 (an individual belonging to the species Homo habilis or Paranthropus boisei), comparing them with modern humans and apes, and evaluating their implications for the knowledge of the locomotor behavior of these hominins, is published by Marchi et al. (2019).
- A study on hominin footprints discovered near Ileret (Kenya) and on their implications for the knowledge of sexual dimorphism in Homo erectus is published by Villmoare, Hatala & Jungers (2019).
- A study reexamining the body mass estimates for the Homo erectus specimen KNM-ER 5428 is published by Cunningham et al. (2019).
- A study aiming to determine the developmental stage of the hominin individual KNM-ER 42700 from Ileret, based on comparisons with modern humans, chimpanzees and individuals classified as Homo erectus sensu lato, is published by Mori & Harvati (2019).
- A study on the evidence of fire at the FxJj20 Site complex in Koobi Fora dated to 1.5 Ma, evaluating its implications for the knowledge of the use of fire by early hominins, is published by Hlubik et al. (2019).
- A study on the age of the artifacts from the Dawqara Formation in the Zarqa Valley (Jordan), and on its implications for the knowledge of timing of the earliest hominin dispersal out of Africa, is published by Scardia et al. (2019).
- A study comparing variation of anatomical traits in Dmanisi hominins with that in fossil hominins and modern Homo sapiens from Africa, and aiming to evaluate the number of hominin taxa present in Dmanisi, is published by Rightmire, Margvelashvili & Lordkipanidze (2019).
- A study on bone surface modifications of Pleistocene bird fossils from Mata Menge site (Flores, Indonesia) is published by Meijer et al. (2019), who report no unambiguous evidence for exploitation of birds from Mata Menge by early hominins.
- A study on the evolution of body size on islands, focusing on the evolution of Homo floresiensis, is published by Diniz-Filho et al. (2019).
- A study on the age of hominin fossils from the Yiyuan fossil site (Shandong, China) is published by Guo et al. (2019).
- A study on the growth and development of teeth of archaic hominins from the Pleistocene site of Xujiayao (China) is published by Xing et al. (2019).
- ~300,000-y-old remains of archaic humans, dubbed the Hualongdong people, including a largely complete skull, are described from Hualongdong (China) by Wu et al. (2019).
- A study on the morphology and affinities of the hominin teeth from the late Middle Pleistocene of the Yanhui Cave (Tongzi, China) is published by Xing, Martinón-Torres & Castro (2019).
- A study on the variation of shape of premolar roots in Middle Pleistocene hominins from East Asia is published by Pan et al. (2019).
- Cut marks and evidence of breakage of animal bones by hominins are reported from the Barranco León and Fuente Nueva-3 localities (Spain) by Espigares et al. (2019), who evaluate the implications of their findings for the knowledge of the subsistence strategies of hominins inhabiting the Iberian Peninsula during the Early Pleistocene.
- A study on the morphology of hominin teeth from the Middle Pleistocene sites of Arago (southeast France) and Sima de los Huesos (northern Spain), as well as on their implications for inferring how the settlement of Europe by hominins in the Middle Pleistocene occurred, is published by Bermúdez de Castro et al. (2019).
- A study on the variation of anatomical traits related to brain size and organization in the sample of hominin endocasts from Sima de los Huesos is published by Poza-Rey, Gómez-Robles & Arsuaga (2019).
- A study on the age of the hominin fossils from Sima de los Huesos is published by Demuro et al. (2019).
- A study on the anatomy of the cochlea of hominins from Sima de los Huesos, evaluating its implications for the knowledge of cochlear evolution in the genus Homo, is published by Conde-Valverde et al. (2019).
- A study on the climate in the areas of the Iberian Peninsula inhabited by hominins during the Early Pleistocene, as indicated by data from macroflora and pollen assemblages, will be published by Altolaguirre et al. (2019).
- A study evaluating the importance of the fifth digit in four technologically distinct Lower Paleolithic stone tool production behaviours is published by Key, Dunmore & Marzke (2019).
- Evidence from the Lusakert Cave 1 site in the Armenian Highlands indicative of control of fire by Middle Paleolithic hominins is presented by Brittingham et al. (2019).
- A study on the shape variation of the dental arcades in Middle Pleistocene hominin fossils will be published by Stelzer et al. (2019).
- A study on the external ballistics of replicas of Schöningen Spear II is published by Milks, Parker & Pope (2019).
- A study on unpublished hominin dental remains from the late Early Pleistocene Gran Dolina-TD6.2 level of the Sierra de Atapuerca (Spain), evaluating their implications for assessing the taxonomic validity of Homo antecessor, is published by Martinón-Torres et al. (2019).
- A study on hominin fossils from the TD6.2 unit of the Gran Dolina site (Spain) which represent the oldest known hominin remains with unquestionable signs of cannibalism, comparing them with other mammal fossils from this site with evidence of human consumption, and evaluating their implications for the knowledge of causes of early hominin cannibalism, is published by Rodríguez, Guillermo & Ana (2019).
- A study on the animal remains from the Villafranchian of the Pirro Nord site (Italy), and on their implications for the knowledge of the exploitation of animal resources by early European hominins, is published by Cheheb et al. (2019).
- A study on the taxonomical affinities of hominin teeth from the Mousterian level of Portel-Ouest (Ariège, France), dated to 44,000 ka, and on the paleobiology of the hominin group from this site, will be published by Becam & Chevalier (2019).
- Evidence of Levallois technology from the lithic assemblage of the Guanyindong Cave site in southwest China, dated to approximately 170,000–80,000 years ago, is presented by Hu et al. (2019); the study is subsequently criticized by Li et al. (2019).
- A study on the age of fossils of Homo erectus from Ngandong (central Java, Indonesia) is published online by Rizal et al. (2019).
- Studies on the age of the hominin-associated material from the Denisova Cave (Russia) are published by Jacobs et al. (2019) and Douka et al. (2019).
- A study on the morphology of a fifth finger phalanx from the Denisova Cave is published by Bennett et al. (2019).
- The Denisovan Xiahe mandible is described from the Baishiya Karst Cave (Tibetan Plateau, China) by Chen et al. (2019), representing the first record of these hominins outside the Altai Mountains; subsequently, a study evaluating this fossil as possible evidence of acquisition of 3-rooted lower molars by modern human populations from Asia by the way of introgression from Denisovans is published by Bailey, Hublin & Antón (2019).
- A reconstruction of Denisovan anatomy, inferred from data from Denisovan DNA, is presented by Gokhman et al. (2019).
- A study on microscopic traces of hominin and animal activities in the Denisova Cave, providing the information on the use of this cave over the last 300,000 years, is published by Morley et al. (2019).
- The study on the Cerutti Mastodon site published by Holen et al. (2017), reporting possible evidence of an unidentified species of the genus Homo living in California 130,000 years ago, is criticized by Ferrell (2019) and by Sutton, Parkinson & Rosen (2019).
- A study on external auditory exostoses (dense bony growths protruding into the external auditory canal) in the skeletons of late Middle and Late Pleistocene archaic and early modern humans from western Eurasia is published by Trinkaus, Samsel & Villotte (2019).
- The discovery of new archaeological assemblage from the Moulin Quignon site (France), representing the earliest occurrence of the Acheulian technology (probably associated with the occurrence of Homo heidelbergensis) in northwest Europe above 50°N recorded so far, is reported by Antoine et al. (2019).
- A study on bifaces from the Notarchirico site (Basilicata, Italy), evaluating their implications for the knowledge of the timing and characterization of the earliest Acheulean in Western Europe, is published by Moncel et al. (2019).
- A study on the origin and evolutionary mode of the Neanderthal lineage, as indicated by data from fossil mandibles, is published by Rosas, Bastir & Alarcón (2019).
- A study on the nuclear genomes of two Neanderthal individuals (from Hohlenstein-Stadel cave in Germany and from Scladina cave in Belgium) dated to approximately 120 ka ago is published by Peyrégne et al. (2019).
- A study on demographic models that could explain presence and variations of Neanderthal portions of the genome carried by non-African individuals today is published by Villanea & Schraiber (2019), who interpret their findings as indicative of multiple episodes of interbreeding between Neanderthal and modern humans.
- A review of evidence for recovery from serious illness and injury by Neanderthals is published by Spikins et al. (2019), who argue that Neanderthal healthcare was widespread, knowledgeable and effective in reducing mortality risk, and that healthcare can be seen as part of several adaptations which allowed Neanderthals to survive in unique environments where they lived, rather than simply a cultural trait.
- A study aiming to find an explanation for the highly muscular Neanderthal body form, based on paleoecological and genetic data, is published by Stewart et al. (2019), who hypothesise that Neanderthal body reflects an adaptation to hunting conditions rather than cold.
- A study on the anomalies of Neanderthal skeletons from the Sidrón Cave (Spain), interpreted as evidence for the presence of inbreeding and low biological variability in the Neanderthal group from this site, is published by Ríos et al. (2019).
- The first anatomical reconstruction of the Eustachian tube of Neanderthals is published by Pagano, Márquez & Laitman (2019).
- A study on the diet of Neanderthals, as indicated by data from compound-specific isotope analyses of Neanderthal remains from Les Cottés cave and Grotte du Renne (France), is published by Jaouen et al. (2019).
- A study on the posture of the La Chapelle-aux-Saints 1 Neanderthal individual is published by Haeusler et al. (2019).
- A study on Neanderthal land use patterns and mobility, as indicated by data from the Payre site (the Rhone Valley, France), is published by Moncel et al. (2019).
- Description of new fossil material of the Regourdou 1 Neanderthal skeleton, providing new information on the anatomy of Neanderthal thorax, is published by Gómez-Olivencia et al. (2019).
- A study on the diet and cultural behavior of the Regourdou 1 Neanderthal individual, as indicated by data from tooth wear, is published by Fiorenza et al. (2019).
- A study exploring the possible cause of the Neanderthal population demise in terms of demographic changes is published by Degioanni et al. (2019).
- A study on introgressed Neanderthal DNA in modern humans, reevaluating the validity of the claims that Neanderthal DNA was subjected to negative selection in modern humans, is published by Petr et al. (2019).
- A study comparing Neanderthal introgression in contemporary Levantine and southern Arabian populations is published by Vyas & Mulligan (2019).
- A study on diet and mobility of the late Neanderthals and Upper Pleistocene modern humans, as indicated by stable isotopic data from individuals from the cave sites of the Troisième caverne of Goyet and Spy in Belgium, is published by Wißing et al. (2019).
- A taphonomic study on two Neanderthal individuals from the Spy Cave, aiming to determine their cause of death and whether they were buried, is published by Fernández-Jalvo & Andrews (2019).
- A study on the diet of the Spy I Neanderthal individual is published by Williams et al. (2019).
- A Neanderthal molar is described from the Pešturina Cave by Radović et al. (2019), representing the first Neanderthal specimen reported from Serbia.
- A study on the timing, intensity and environmental context of the occupation of the Middle Paleolithic El Salt site (Province of Alicante, Spain) by Neanderthals is published by Leierer et al. (2019).
- A study on the dietary patterns and the ecological niches occupied by ungulates from the Mousterian of the Covalejos Cave (Cantabria, Spain), as inferred from analyses of teeth wear and dental cementum, is published by Sánchez-Hernández et al. (2019), who evaluate the implications of their findings for the knowledge of the environmental conditions of this region, the knowledge of the age and season at the time of death these ungulates, and the knowledge of the seasonality and duration of Neanderthal occupations of the Covalejos Cave and the seasonality of their hunting activities.
- A study aiming to identify adhesive used by Neanderthals for hafting on a variety of stone tools from Middle Paleolithic Fossellone and Sant'Agostino caves (Latium, Italy) is published by Degano et al. (2019).
- A study on manganese-rich lumps recovered from the lower rockshelter at Le Moustier site (France), evaluating their implications for the knowledge of processing of manganese-rich rocks by Neanderthals, is published by Pitarch Martí et al. (2019).
- A study on the geological and cultural stratigraphy of the Ein Qashish site (Israel), and on its implications for the knowledge of Neanderthal occupation of this site, is published by Ekshtain et al. (2019).
- Evidence from Neanderthal-associated sites in Europe indicating that Neanderthals practiced catching the golden eagles is presented by Finlayson et al. (2019).
- Evidence of Châtelperronian Neanderthals using pedal phalanges of imperial eagles for symbolic practices is reported from the Cova Foradà site (Spain) by Rodríguez-Hidalgo et al. (2019).
- A study on the strategies, methods and butchery practices adopted by Neanderthals in the exploitation of the steppe bison and the aurochs, based on data from the Fumane Cave, San Bernardino Cave and De Nadale Cave (Italy), is published by Terlato et al. (2019).
- A study evaluating whether climatic changes caused depopulation of the Ach Valley (Germany) by Neanderthals during the Oxygen Isotope Stage 3 is published by Rhodes, Starkovich & Conard (2019).
- A study on the impact of the climate change during the last interglacial period on the behavior of Neanderthals living in Western Europe, based on data from Baume de Moula-Guercy (France), is published by Defleur & Desclaux (2019).
- A study on DNA isolated from Neanderthal remains found in Gibraltar is published by Bokelmann et al. (2019).
- A previously unknown way to produce birch tar is presented by Schmidt et al. (2019), who evaluate the implications of their findings for a determination of whether birch tar production by Neanderthals is a proof of the presence of modern cognition and/or cultural behaviors in Neanderthals.
- Niekus et al. (2019) describe a 50,000-y-old birch tar-hafted flint tool found off the coastline of The Netherlands, likely produced by Neanderthals.
- Duveau et al. (2019) report the discovery of 257 footprints of Neanderthals from the Paleolithic site at Le Rozel (France), and investigate the size and composition of the trackmaker group.
- A study aiming to determine the reason of the delay of the replacement of Neanderthals by modern humans after their initial contact in the Levant is published by Greenbaum et al. (2019).
- A study on the dynamics of Neanderthal populations, evaluating factors which could have resulted in Neanderthal extinction, is published by Vaesen et al. (2019).
- A study aiming to infer the time at which Neanderthals and modern humans diverged, based on quantitative analyses of dental evolutionary rates in hominins and analyses of hominin phylogenetic relationships, is published by Gómez-Robles (2019).
- A study comparing tooth-use behaviors of early modern humans and Neanderthals is published by Krueger et al. (2019).
- A study on the archaeological sequence from Cova Foradà on the Mediterranean coast of Catalonia, representing the southernmost episode of Châtelperronian and Early Aurignacian documented to date in western Europe, is published by Morales et al. (2019).
- Evidence of a third introgression from an archaic human population in all Asian and Oceanian modern human populations, in addition to known Neanderthal and Denisovan introgressions, is presented by Mondal, Bertranpetit & Lao (2019).
- A study on the sequence and timing of early human migrations out of Africa and across the rest of the world, as inferred from evidence of introgression events preserved in the genomes of modern-day human populations, is published by Teixeira & Cooper (2019).
- A study on genetic differences between modern humans and archaic hominins is published by Kuhlwilm & Boeckx (2019).
- Colbran et al. (2019) present a method to identify divergent gene regulation between archaic hominin and anatomically modern human sequences, and study differences in gene regulatory architecture between the two groups.
- A study on the biological foundations of modern human endocranial shape, as indicated by paleoanthropological data from Neanderthal fossils and neuroimaging and genomic data from present-day humans, is published by Gunz et al. (2019).
- Neanderthal-like traits are reported in the occipital bones of recent Homo sapiens individuals from Australia by Nowaczewska et al. (2019), who evaluate the implications of their findings for the study of human evolution.
- Two fossilized human crania, of which one is dated to more than 170,000 years ago and has a Neanderthal-like morphology and the other one is dated to more than 210,000 years ago and presents a mixture of modern human and primitive features, are described from Apidima Cave (southern Greece) by Harvati et al. (2019).
- A CT-based virtual reconstruction of the Apidima 2 fossil cranium is presented by Bräuer et al. (2019).
- A study on the timing of the earliest occupation of Stelida archaeological site (Naxos, Greece) by Greece, reporting possible first evidence for Neanderthals in the region, is published by Carter et al. (2019), who evaluate the implications of this site for the knowledge of possible routes of hominin dispersal into Southeast Europe.
- A study on the evolutionary history of the modern human face is published by Lacruz et al. (2019).
- A study aiming to determine the advantages of heat treating of toolstone by early humans is published by Mraz et al. (2019).
- A study on the mitochondrial DNA of contemporary southern Africans is published by Chan et al. (2019), who interpret their findings as evidence of a southern African origin of anatomically modern humans and their sustained occupation of the homeland before their first migrations out of southern Africa, likely caused by regional climate shifts.
- A study on Pleistocene artifacts from Aduma (Middle Awash, Ethiopia) and their implications for the knowledge of the origin of complex projectiles is published by Sahle & Brooks (2019).
- A study on the phylogeography of human mtDNA L0 lineages in southern Africa and the rest of sub-Saharan Africa, and on its implications for the knowledge of early gene flow between continental regions in the Middle Stone Age, is published by Rito et al. (2019), who interpret their findings as indicative of human dispersal from southern to eastern Africa immediately preceding the out-of-Africa expansions.
- A Middle Stone Age lithic assemblage and human-accumulated animal remains, representing the oldest evidence of human settlement and adaptation to areas above 4000-meter elevation in Africa reported so far, are described from the Fincha Habera rock shelter (Bale Mountains, Ethiopia) by Ossendorf et al. (2019).
- A study on the hominin-bearing Plovers Lake site (South Africa), previously interpreted as a Middle Stone Age site, is published by Lombard et al. (2019), who reinterpret the sampled human and bovid remains as more likely to represent a Bantu-speaking Iron Age population and their cattle.
- Kumbani et al. (2019) describe possible sound-producing artefacts from Later Stone Age deposits in the southern Cape, South Africa.
- Humphrey et al. (2019) report on the burials of six infants from Later Stone Age levels at Taforalt (Morocco).
- Two assemblages of flint retouchers are described from the Middle Paleolithic sites Nesher Ramla (Israel) and Quneitra (Golan Heights) by Centi et al. (2019).
- Description of bird remains from the Qesem cave (Israel) dated to between 420 and 200 ka, and a study on their implications for the knowledge of interactions of birds and humans occupying the site, is published by Blasco et al. (2019).
- The earliest evidence for storage and delayed consumption of bone marrow by humans occupying the Qesem cave ~420 to 200 ka is presented by Blasco et al. (2019).
- A study investigating possible routes of human dispersals between Central and eastern Asia between Marine Isotope Stage 5 and Marine Isotope Stage 3 is published by Li et al. (2019).
- A study on the Tolbor-16 archaeological site located in the Northern Hangai Mountains, documenting the early occurrence of the Upper Paleolithic in Mongolia, is published by Zwyns et al. (2019).
- A study on the subsistence strategies of humans occupying the Les Cottés site (France) during the Middle to Upper Paleolithic transition is published by Rendu et al. (2019).
- Replacement of late Mousterian industries by Aurignacian ones at the site of Bajondillo Cave (Málaga, southern Spain) is reported by Cortés-Sánchez et al. (2019), who also evaluate when this event took place; the study is subsequently criticized by de la Peña (2019) and Anderson, Reynolds & Teyssandier (2019).
- A study aiming to estimate hunter-gatherer population sizes and densities for the Aurignacian techno-complex in Europe is published by Schmidt & Zimmermann (2019).
- A study on the age of human and animal skeletal remains associated with the purported Aurignacian lithic assemblage from the Fontana Nuova site (Sicily, Italy) is published by Di Maida et al. (2019), who report that these remains date to Holocene rather than Aurignacian.
- A study on lithic pieces from the Uluzzian technocomplex (45–40 thousand years ago) at Grotta del Cavallo (Italy), interpreted as mechanically delivered projectile weapons produced by anatomically modern humans, is published by Sano et al. (2019).
- A study on the skeletal trauma of the human calvaria from Cioclovina (Romania), dated to approximately 33,000 calendar years before present, is published by Kranioti, Grigorescu & Harvati (2019), who interpret this finding as evidence of fatal interpersonal violence among early Upper Paleolithic modern humans of Europe.
- A study on the assemblage of ornaments from the Gravettian settlement of Poiana Cireșului (Romania), and on its implications for the knowledge of the mobility and connections of the Gravettian communities living in the area of present-day Romania with Mediterranean ones, is published by Nițu et al. (2019).
- A study on human mobility strategies during the Last Glacial Maximum in southern Italy, as indicated by strontium and stable isotope data from human remains from the Paglicci Cave, is published by Lugli et al. (2019).
- A study on the impact of environmental constraints on the size, distribution and structure of human populations living in Western Europe during the Last Glacial Maximum is published by Wren & Burke (2019).
- A study on human footprints, handprints and other traces from the Upper Paleolithic of the Bàsura Cave (Italy), and on their implications for the knowledge of the behavior and social structure of the human group inhabiting this cave, is published by Romano et al. (2019).
- A study aiming to determine whether changes over the past 38,000 years in European height predicted using ancient DNA from ancient Europeans are consistent with changes observed in skeletal remains from comparable populations is published by Cox et al. (2019).
- A study on the age of the Pleistocene skullcap found in the Salkhit Valley in northeast Mongolia is published by Devièse et al. (2019), who also reconstruct the complete mitochondrial genome of this specimen.
- A study on human skeletal remains from Pleistocene and Holocene sites in East Asia, and on their implications for inferring the history of the colonization of East Asia by anatomically modern humans, is published by Matsumura et al. (2019).
- A study on the evolution of the microblade technology in East Asia, as indicated by data from the Upper Paleolithic site Shizitan 29 (Shanxi, China), is published by Song et al. (2019).
- A study on the age Fa-Hien Lena archeological site (Sri Lanka) and on the faunal assemblage from this site is published by Wedage et al. (2019), who interpret their findings as evidence of specialized, sophisticated hunting of semi-arboreal and arboreal prey animals by humans living ca. 45,000 years ago.
- A study on a Late Pleistocene lithic assemblage from the Fa Hien Cave (Sri Lanka), representing the earliest known microlith assemblage from South Asia in firm association with evidence for the procurement of small to medium size arboreal prey and rainforest plants, is published by Wedage et al. (2019).
- A 15,000 years-old individual belonging to the species Homo sapiens, preserving an unusual number of primitive anatomical features of teeth, is described from the Dushan Cave (China) by Liao et al. (2019).
- A study on the late Pleistocene population history of northeastern Siberia, based on data from 34 ancient genomes, is published by Sikora et al. (2019).
- An elaborate rock art panel portraying hunting scenes, dated to at least 43.9 ka, is described from the limestone cave of Leang Bulu' Sipong 4 (Sulawesi, Indonesia) by Aubert et al. (2019).
- A study evaluating the probability of successful accidental crossing of early humans from Asia to Sahul through Wallacea is published by Bird et al. (2019).
- Late Pleistocene human remains, representing the first anatomically modern human remains recovered in Wallacea dated to this period, are described from two rockshelters from Alor Island (Indonesia) by Samper Carro et al. (2019).
- A study aiming to determine the resilience and minimum population size required to avoid extinction of first people colonizing Sahul is published by Bradshaw et al. (2019).
- A review of evidence for Pleistocene symbolic behaviour in Sahul, Sunda and Wallacea is published by Langley, Clarkson & Ulm (2019).
- A study aiming to determine the relationships between extinctions of megafauna, climatic changes and patterns of human appearance in south-eastern Australia over the last 120,000 years is published by Saltré et al. (2019).
- A study on the history of dispersal of people into and within the Americas, as indicated by data from Native American Y chromosomes, is published by Pinotti et al. (2019).
- A review of research advances from the preceding years concerning the settlement of the Americas by modern humans is published by Waters (2019).
- A study on the timing of the earliest occupation of the Cooper's Ferry archaeological site (Idaho, United States) by humans is published by Davis et al. (2019).
- A study on teeth and diet of Late Pleistocene woman "Naia" from the Yucatán Peninsula (Mexico) is published by Cucina, Atoche & Chatters (2019).
- A late Pleistocene human footprint is described from the Pilauco Bajo site (Chile) by Moreno et al. (2019).
- A study on stone tools from the Tzibte Yux and Mayahak Cab Pek rockshelters (Belize) and their implications for the knowledge of changes in stone tool technology in North America and tropical Central and South America during the late Pleistocene and early Holocene is published by Prufer et al. (2019).
- A study on the foraging behavior, landscape management, and resource utilization strategies of early tropical hunter-gatherers in southwestern Amazonia, as indicated by data from archaeological sites from three forest islands in the Llanos de Moxos, is published by Capriles et al. (2019).
- A study on the timing of the human settlement of Madagascar is published by Douglass et al. (2019).
- New genome-wide data from eight prehistoric humans, including 15,000-year-old Anatolian hunter-gatherer, is presented by Feldman et al. (2019).
- A study on a broken tool from the Hilazon Tachtit cave (Israel), interpreted as evidence for intentional breakage associated with ritual activity 12,000 years ago, is published by Dubreuil et al. (2019).
- A study on the processing sequence involved in the manufacture of a skull-cup and the manipulation of human bones from the Early Neolithic of Cueva de El Toro (Málaga, Spain), and on its implications for inferring the character of cannibalistic practices in Early Neolithic communities living in southern Iberia, is published by Santana et al. (2019).
- New genome-wide data from individuals from sites in the Iberian Peninsula ranging from ~13,000–6,000 calibrated years BP is presented by Villalba-Mouco et al. (2019), who report evidence of Iberian hunter-gatherers carrying dual ancestry from both Villabruna and the Magdalenian-related individuals, and of these two lineages of Late Pleistocene ancestry surviving into Holocene in the Iberian Peninsula.
- A study on the changes of the human population size in the Iberian Peninsula during the Pleistocene–Holocene transition is published by Fernández-López de Pablo et al. (2019).
- A study evaluating how hunter-gatherers living along the southern North Sea coast adapted to climatic and environmental changes at the beginning of the Holocene, based on data on variability of stone arrowheads and barbs from this area, is published by Crombé (2019).
- Mitochondrial genomes from two ~7000-year-old individuals from Takarkori rock shelter (Libya), representing the earliest and first genetic data for the Sahara region, are presented by Vai et al. (2019).
- A study on early human evolution in Africa, based on analysis of the genomic variation in a collection of whole-genome samples from 15 different African populations, is published by Lorente-Galdos et al. (2019).
- A study comparing North African genomes with extant and ancient genome data, and using this data to determine the demographic impact of Neolithization and later migration waves in North Africa, is published by Serra-Vidal et al. (2019).
- González-Fortes et al. (2019) sequence whole genomes from four human remains from northern Portugal and southern Spain dated around 4000 years BP, and report that one of them carried the sub-Saharan mitochondrial haplogroup L2a1, potentially representing the first record of this haplogroup in ancient human remains outside Africa reported so far, and interpret their findings as evidence of an early migration process from Africa into the Iberian Peninsula through a western route.
- Genome-wide data from 271 ancient Iberians living over the past 8000 years is presented by Olalde et al. (2019).
- A study on human migrations and admixture events in South and Central Asia, based on ancient DNA data from 523 individuals spanning the last 8000 years, is published by Narasimhan et al. (2019).
- A study on the history of Holocene peopling events of Chukotka and North America, based on genomic data from 48 ancient individuals from Chukotka, East Siberia, the Aleutian Islands, Alaska, and the Canadian Arctic, is published by Flegontov et al. (2019).
- A study on the impact of the transition from prehistoric foragers to contemporary societies on the human speech apparatus is published by Blasi et al. (2019).
- A study on human land use worldwide from 10,000 years before the present to 1850 CE, indicating that Earth was to a large extent transformed by human activity by 3000 years ago, is published by Stephens et al. (2019).
- Evidence for synchronous cyclical changes in monsoon climate, human activity and prehistoric cultural development in the area of northeast China throughout the Holocene is presented by Xu et al. (2019).
- Evidence of presence of managed aquaculture of the common carp by around 6000 BC is reported from the Early Neolithic Jiahu site (China) by Nakajima et al. (2019).
