= Neanderthal extinction =

Neanderthal extinction

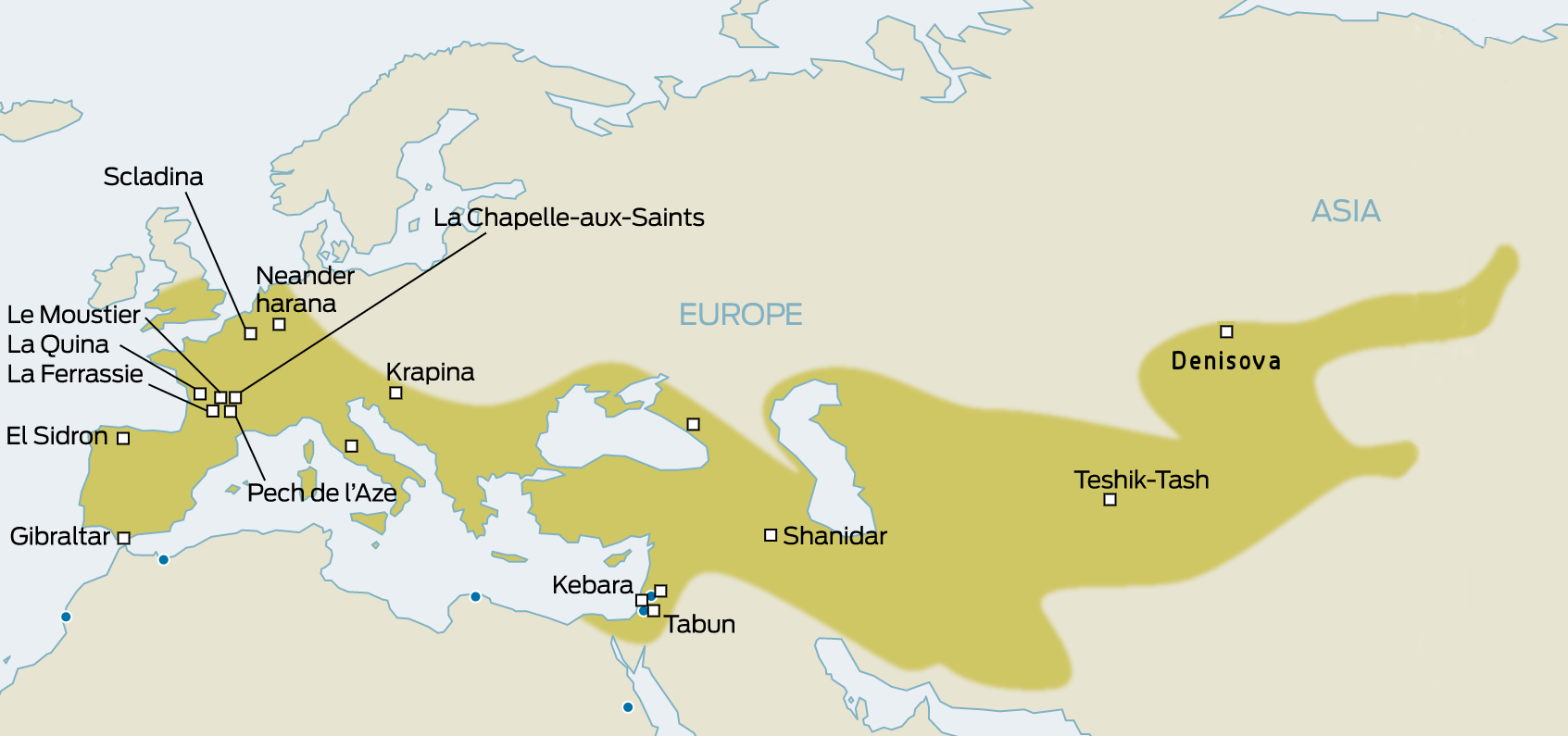
Known population distribution of Neanderthals, with main sites.

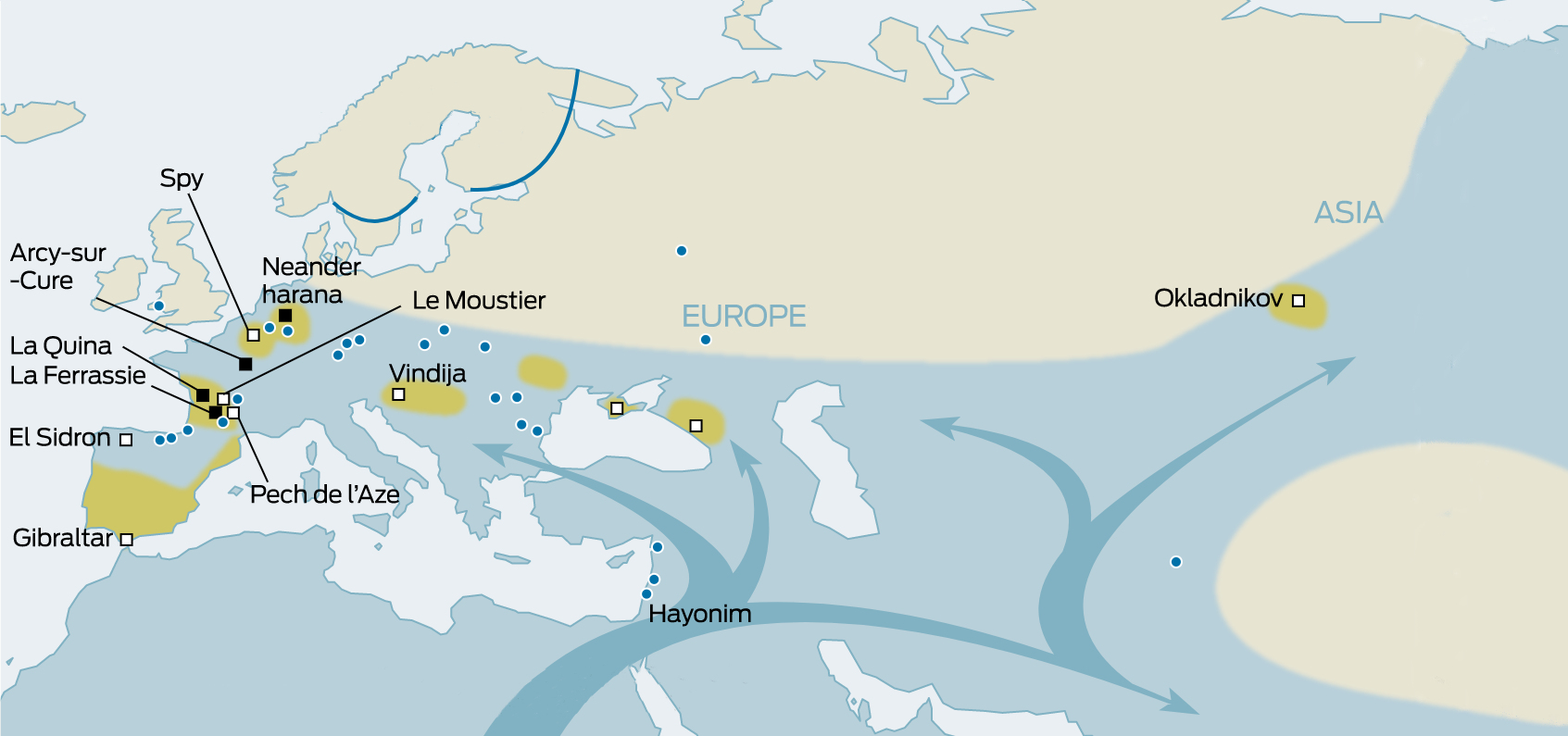
Replacement of Neanderthals by early modern humans.

Neanderthals became extinct around 40,000 years ago. Hypotheses on the causes of the extinction include violence, transmission of diseases from modern humans to which Neanderthals had no immunity, competitive replacement, extinction by interbreeding with early modern human populations, natural catastrophes, climate change, and inbreeding depression. It is likely that multiple factors caused the demise of an already low population.

== Upper Palaeolithic Transition ==
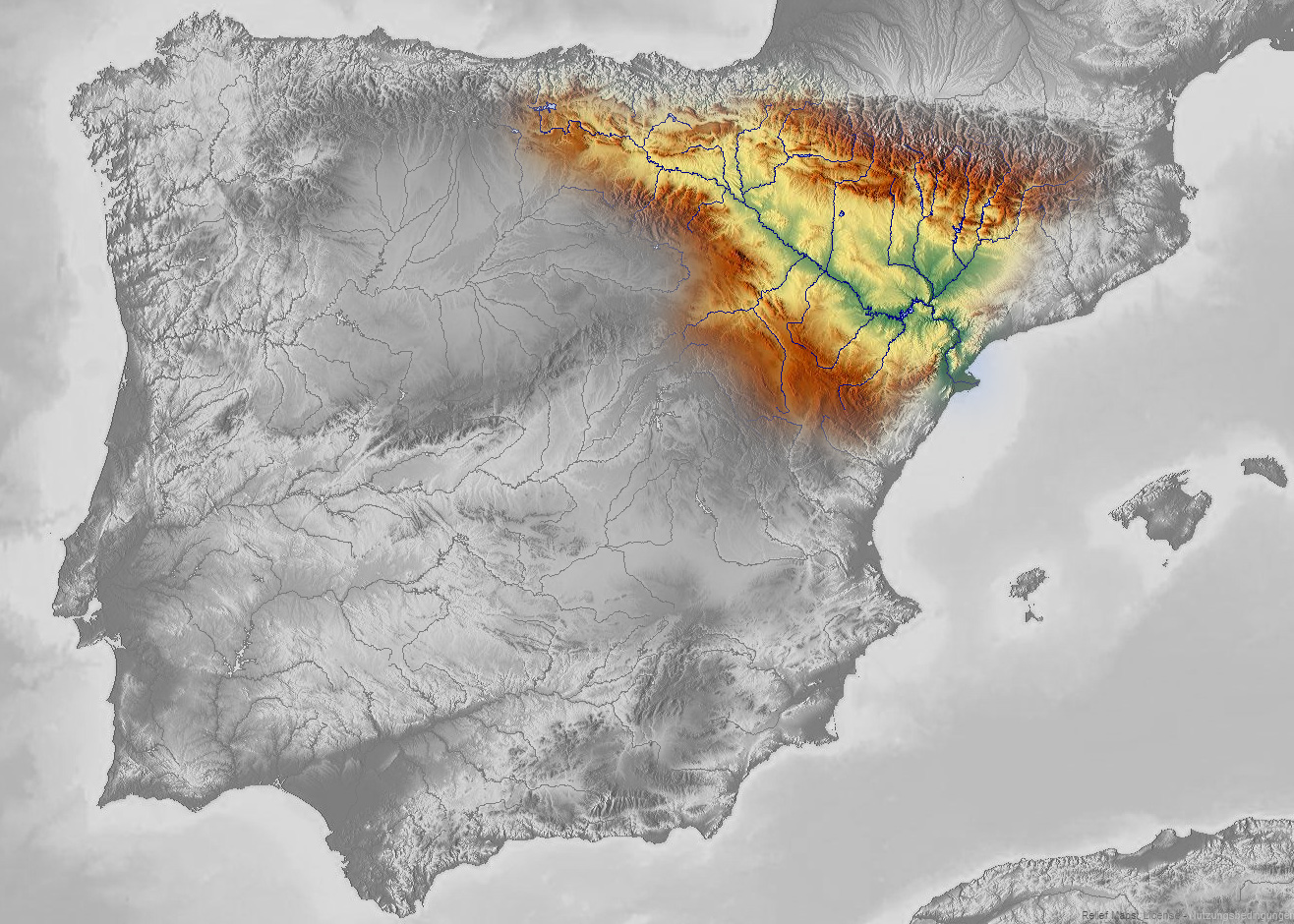
Map emphasising the Ebro River in northern Spain

The extinction of Neanderthals was part of the broader Late Pleistocene megafaunal extinction event. Whatever the cause of their extinction, Neanderthals were replaced by modern humans, indicated by near full replacement of Middle Palaeolithic Mousterian stone technology with modern human Upper Palaeolithic Aurignacian stone technology across Europe (the Middle-to-Upper Palaeolithic Transition) from 41,000 to 39,000 years ago. By between 44,200 and 40,600 BP, Neanderthals vanished from northwestern Europe. However, it is postulated that Iberian Neanderthals persisted until about 35,000 years ago, as indicated by the date range of transitional lithic assemblages—Châtelperronian, Uluzzian, Protoaurignacian and Early Aurignacian. The latter two are attributed to modern humans, but the former two have unconfirmed authorship, potentially products of Neanderthal/modern human cohabitation and cultural transmission. Further, the appearance of the Aurignacian south of the Ebro River has been dated to roughly 37,500 years ago, which has prompted the "Ebro Frontier" hypothesis which states that the river presented a geographic barrier preventing modern human immigration, and thus prolonging Neanderthal persistence. However, the dating of the Iberian Transition is debated, with a contested timing of 43,000–40,800 years ago at Cueva Bajondillo, Spain. The Châtelperronian appears in northeastern Iberia about 42,500–41,600 years ago.

Some Neanderthal fossils were dated to much later than this—such as those found at Zafarraya (30,000 years ago) and Gorham's Cave (28,000 years ago)—which may be inaccurate as they were based on ambiguous artefacts instead of direct dating. A claim of Neanderthals surviving in a polar refuge in the Ural Mountains is loosely supported by Mousterian stone tools dating to 34,000 years ago from the northern Siberian Byzovaya site at a time when modern humans may not yet have colonised the northern reaches of Europe; however, modern human remains are known from the nearby Mamontovaya Kurya site dating to 40,000 years ago. Indirect dating of Neanderthals remains from Mezmaiskaya Cave reported a date of about 30,000 years ago, but direct dating instead yielded 39,700±1,100 years ago, more in line with trends exhibited in the rest of Europe.

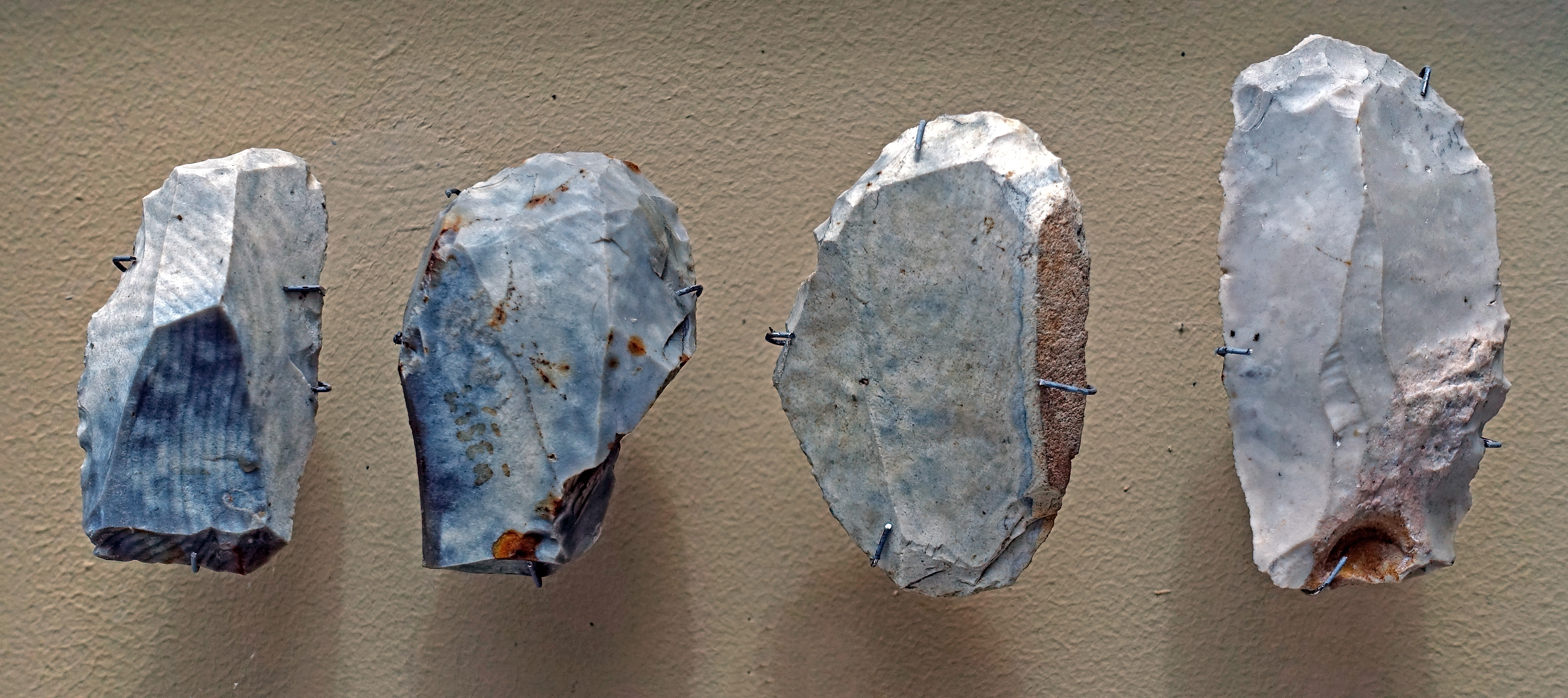
Bohunician scrapers in the Moravian Museum, Czech Republic

The earliest indication of Upper Palaeolithic modern human immigration into Europe is a series of modern human teeth with Neronian industry stone tools found at Mandrin Cave, Malataverne in France, dated in 2022 to between 56,800 and 51,700 years ago. The earliest bones in Europe date to roughly 45–43,000 years ago in Bulgaria, Italy, and Britain. This wave of modern humans replaced Neanderthals. However, Neanderthals and H. sapiens have a much longer contact history. DNA evidence indicates H. sapiens contact with Neanderthals and admixture as early as 120–100,000 years ago.

== Possible causes of extinction ==
=== Violence ===
Kwang Hyun Ko discusses the possibility that Neanderthal extinction was either precipitated or hastened by violent conflict with Homo sapiens. Violence in early hunter-gatherer societies usually occurred as a result of resource competition following natural disasters. It is therefore plausible to suggest that violence, including primitive warfare, would have transpired between the two human species. French paleontologist Marcellin Boule (the first person to publish an analysis of a Neanderthal) in 1912 is frequently cited for popularizing the brutish image of Neanderthals. While he did not invent the idea of conflict, Boule's specific, flawed morphological analysis—based on a severely arthritic skeleton—solidified the image of a Neanderthal as an unintelligent, violent, or apelike creature that deserved to be replaced by modern humans. The idea that Neanderthals were a violent, distinct species inferior to modern humans originated earlier, notably with William King (1864), following the initial 1856 Neandertal Valley find (1856), who named Homo neanderthalensis and immediately contrasted the species with Homo sapiens and placed it low on the evolutionary ladder, implicating a hierarchical superiority of modern humans. The notion of a violent replacement was rooted in 19th-century colonial ideology, social Darwinism and early evolutionary theories that viewed extinction as a natural consequence of the competition between a superior and inferior.

=== Parasites and pathogens ===
The hypothesized long period of a fairly stable boundary in the Middle East between Neanderthals and modern humans may have been due to each species being genetically adapted to Asian and African infectious illnesses respectively. The boundary would have been erased by evolution of both parasites and hosts, including gene transfer between the hominin populations, allowing the modern humans to expand out of Africa.

Infectious diseases carried by Homo sapiens may have passed to Neanderthals, who would have had poor protection to infections they had not previously been exposed to, leading to devastating consequences for Neanderthal populations. Homo sapiens may have been less vulnerable to Neanderthal diseases, partly because they had evolved to cope with the far higher disease load of the tropics and so were more able to cope with novel pathogens, and partly because the higher numbers of Homo sapiens meant that even devastating outbreaks would still have left enough survivors for a viable population.

If viruses could easily jump between these two similar species, possibly because they lived near together, Homo sapiens might have infected Neanderthals and prevented the epidemic from burning out as Neanderthal numbers declined. The same process may also explain Homo sapiens' resilience to Neanderthal diseases and parasites. Novel human diseases likely moved from Africa into Eurasia. This purported "African advantage" remained until the agricultural revolution 10,000 years ago in Eurasia, after which domesticated animals surpassed other primates as the most prevalent source of new human infections, replacing the "African advantage" with a "Eurasian advantage". The catastrophic impact of Eurasian viruses on Native American populations in the historical past offers a sense of how modern humans may have affected hominin predecessor groups in Eurasia 40,000 years ago. Human and Neanderthal genomes and disease or parasite adaptations may give insight on this.

In late-20th-century New Guinea, due to cannibalistic funerary practices, the Fore people were decimated by transmissible spongiform encephalopathies, specifically kuru, a highly virulent disease spread by ingestion of prions found in brain tissue. However, individuals with the 129 variant of the PRNP gene were naturally immune to the prions. Studying this gene led to the discovery that the 129 variant was widespread among all modern humans, which could indicate widespread cannibalism at some point in human prehistory. Because Neanderthals are known to have practised cannibalism to an extent and to have co-existed with modern humans, British palaeoanthropologist Simon Underdown speculated that modern humans transmitted a kuru-like spongiform disease to Neanderthals, and, because the 129 variant appears to have been absent in Neanderthals, it quickly killed them off.

=== Competitive replacement ===
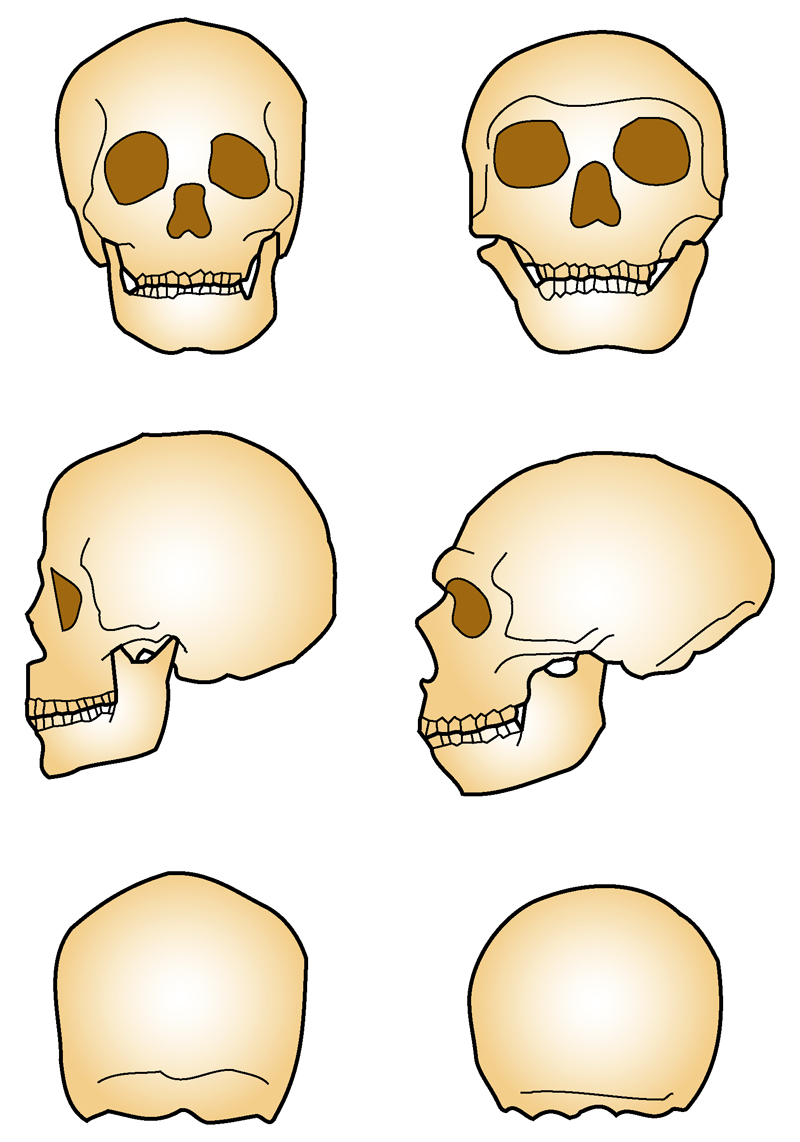
Sapiens and Neanderthal skulls

==== Species specific disadvantages ====
Slight competitive advantage on the part of modern humans may have accounted for Neanderthals' decline on a timescale of thousands of years.

Generally small and widely dispersed fossil sites suggest that Neanderthals lived in less numerous and socially more isolated groups than contemporary Homo sapiens. Tools such as Mousterian flint stone flakes and Levallois points are remarkably sophisticated from the outset, yet they have a slow rate of variability and general technological inertia is noticeable during the entire fossil period. Artifacts are of utilitarian nature, and symbolic behavioral traits are undocumented before the arrival of modern humans in Europe around 40,000 to 35,000 years ago.

The noticeable morphological differences in skull shape between the two human species also have cognitive implications. These include the Neanderthals' smaller parietal lobes and cerebellum, areas implicated in tool use, visuospatial integration, numeracy, creativity, and higher-order conceptualization. The differences, while slight, would have possibly been enough to affect natural selection and may underlie and explain the differences in social behaviors, technological innovation, and artistic output.

Jared Diamond, a supporter of competitive replacement, points out in his book The Third Chimpanzee that the replacement of Neanderthals by modern humans is comparable to patterns of behavior that occur whenever people with advanced technology clash with people with less developed technology.

==== Division of labour ====
In 2006, it was posited that Neanderthal division of labour between the sexes was less developed than Middle Paleolithic Homo sapiens. Both male and female Neanderthals participated in the single occupation of hunting big game, such as bison, deer, gazelles, and wild horses. This hypothesis proposes that the Neanderthal's relative lack of labour division resulted in less efficient extraction of resources from the environment as compared to Homo sapiens.

==== Anatomical differences and running ability ====
Researchers such as Karen L. Steudel of the University of Wisconsin have highlighted the relationship of Neanderthal anatomy (shorter and stockier than that of modern humans) and the ability to run and the requirement of energy (30% more).

Nevertheless, in a recent study, researchers Martin Hora and Vladimir Sladek of Charles University in Prague show that Neanderthal lower limb configuration, particularly the combination of robust knees, long heels, and short lower limbs, increased the effective mechanical advantage of the Neanderthal knee and ankle extensors, thus reducing the force needed and the energy spent for locomotion significantly. The walking cost of the Neanderthal male is now estimated to be 8–12% higher than that of anatomically modern males, whereas the walking cost of the Neanderthal female is considered to be virtually equal to that of anatomically modern females.

Other researchers, like Yoel Rak, from Tel-Aviv University in Israel, have noted that the fossil records show that Neanderthal pelvises in comparison to modern human pelvises would have made it much harder for Neanderthals to absorb shocks and to bounce off from one step to the next, giving modern humans another advantage over Neanderthals in running and walking ability. However, Rak also notes that all archaic humans had wide pelvises, indicating that this is the ancestral morphology and that modern humans underwent a shift towards narrower pelvises in the late Pleistocene.

==== Modern humans and alliance with dogs ====
Pat Shipman argues that the domestication of the dog gave modern humans an advantage when hunting. Dogs attributable to the lineage of modern Canis familiaris have been found in Belgium (31,700 BP) and in Siberia (33,000 BP).

A survey of early sites of modern humans and Neanderthals with faunal remains across Spain, Portugal and France provided an overview of what modern humans and Neanderthals ate. Rabbit became more frequent, while large mammals – the main items in the diet of Neanderthals – became increasingly rare.

=== Interbreeding ===
At the time of the last Neanderthals, approximately 45 to 40 thousand years ago, genetic analysis suggests that there was a gene flow from Neanderthals to modern humans of around 10%, but almost no flow from modern humans to Neanderthals. This may be an artifact due to the small number of late Neanderthal genomes, or because hybrids were not viable in Neanderthal groups, or because fertile Neanderthals were being absorbed into modern human groups but not vice versa. If the effect was real over an extended period, it would have increased the size of the modern human gene pool and reduced that of the already sparse Neanderthals, contributing to reduce their numbers below a viable population and thus to their extinction. A 2025 study proposed an analytical mathematical model to explain the disappearance of Neanderthals through progressive genetic dilution caused by successive waves of small-scale immigration of Homo sapiens into Neanderthal populations. However, as the authors point out, other possible factors, such as environmental changes, competition, or demographic fluctuations, cannot be excluded.

=== Inbreeding ===
According to a study by Rios et al, kinship patterns among recovered Neanderthal remains suggests that there was inbreeding, such as pairings between half-siblings and/or uncle/aunt and niece/nephew. Researchers hypothesize that Neanderthals may have become isolated into small groups during harsh climatic conditions, which contributed to inbreeding behaviours. Due to the lack of genetic diversity, Neanderthal populations would have become more vulnerable to climatic changes, diseases, and other stressors, which may have contributed to their extinction. A similar model to the inbreeding hypothesis can be seen among endangered lowland gorillas. Their populations are so small that it has caused inbreeding, making them even more vulnerable to extinction.

=== Climate change ===
Their ultimate extinction coincides with Heinrich event 4, a period of intense seasonality; later Heinrich events are also associated with massive cultural turnovers when European human populations collapsed. This climate change may have depopulated several regions of Neanderthals, like previous cold spikes, but these areas were instead repopulated by immigrating humans, leading to Neanderthal extinction. In southern Iberia, there is evidence that Neanderthal populations declined during H4 and the associated proliferation of Artemisia-dominated desert-steppes.

The data reveal that sudden climatic change, although crucial locally, had a limited effect on the worldwide Neanderthal population. Interbreeding and assimilation, which were hypothesized as causes in the death of European Neanderthal populations, are successful only for low levels of food competition. Future research will examine models of interbreeding, and hybridization may be evaluated using genomic records from the last ice age (Fu et al., 2016).

=== Natural catastrophe ===
A number of researchers have argued that the Campanian Ignimbrite Eruption, a volcanic eruption near Naples, Italy, about 39,280 ± 110 years ago (older estimate ~37,000 years), erupting about 200 km^{3} (48 cu mi) of magma (500 km^{3} (120 cu mi) bulk volume) contributed to the extinction of Neanderthals. The argument has been developed by Golovanova et al. The hypothesis posits that although Neanderthals had encountered several Interglacials during 250,000 years in Europe, inability to adapt their hunting methods caused their extinction facing Homo sapiens competition when Europe changed into a sparsely vegetated steppe and semi-desert during the last Ice Age. Studies of sediment layers at Mezmaiskaya Cave suggest a severe reduction of plant pollen. The damage to plant life would have led to a corresponding decline in plant-eating mammals hunted by the Neanderthals.

=== Magnetic reversal ===
A group of researchers consisting of Agnit Mukhopadhyay and others have suggested that the Laschamps geomagnetic excursion, a short reversal of Earth's magnetic field around 41,000 years ago, may have contributed to the extinction of the Neanderthals. The excursion caused a weakening of the intensity of the magnetic field which protects Earth from harmful radiation, including ultraviolet radiation, which is dangerous to humans. It is argued that modern humans may have been less susceptible to the radiation's damaging effects than Neanderthals because they used ochre as a sunshield and wore tailored clothing, which provides more protection than the Neanderthals' simple draped clothing. Montserrat Sanz Borràs and José-Miguel Tejero dispute the hypothesis. They argue Mukhopadhyay's study failed to rule out the possibility that Neanderthals also used ochre as a sunshield and also wore tailored clothing, made through other methods the study did not consider. In addition, they also note that there were groups of humans who did not wear tailored clothing but still survived the excursion.

== See also ==
- List of hominina (hominid) fossils
- Quaternary extinction event – Extinction of large animals at the end of the last Ice Age
