= Laodamia (disambiguation) =

Laodamia may refer to:

- Laodamia, the name of several characters in Greek mythology
- Laodamia (moth), a genus of moths
- "Laodamia" (Wordsworth), a poem by William Wordsworth
- 1011 Laodamia, an asteroid
