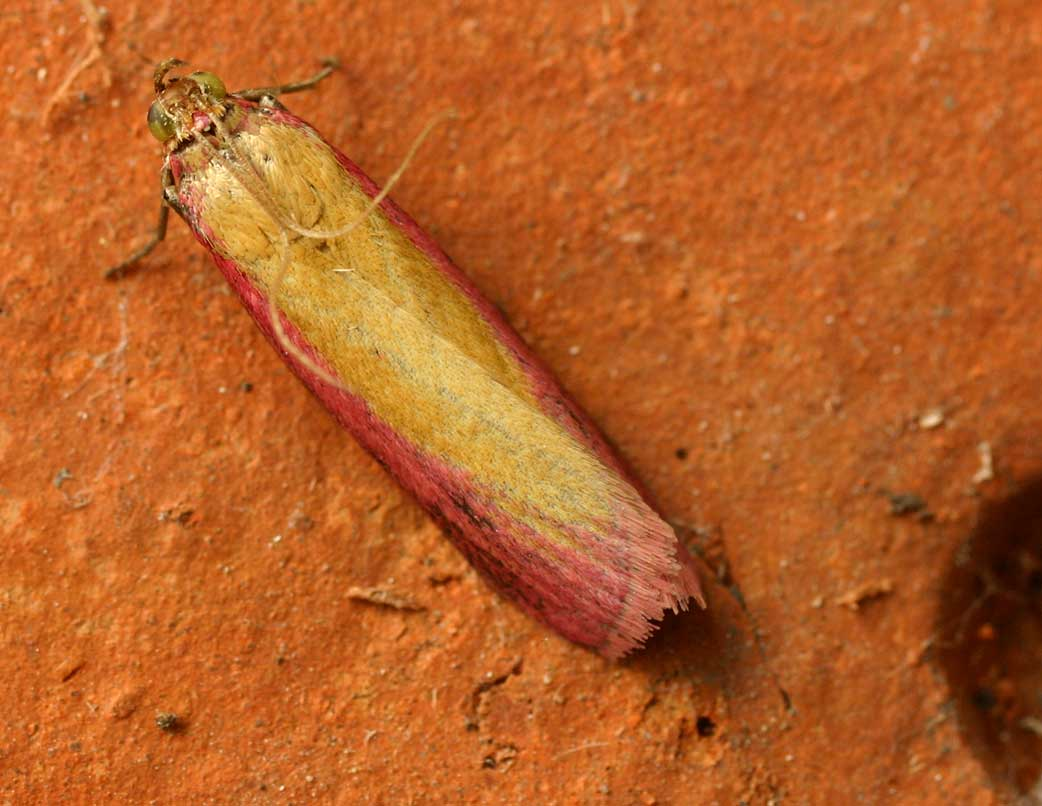
- O. semirubella from Eure-et-Loir, France

Scientific classification
- Domain: Eukaryota
- Kingdom: Animalia
- Phylum: Arthropoda
- Class: Insecta
- Order: Lepidoptera
- Family: Pyralidae
- Genus: Oncocera
- Species: O. semirubella

Binomial name
- Oncocera semirubella (Scopoli, 1763)

Synonyms
- Phalaena semirubella Scopoli, 1763; Oncocera semirubella mediterranea Roesler, 1980; Phalaena carnella Linnaeus, 1767

= Oncocera semirubella =

Species of moth

Oncocera semirubella, the rosy-striped knot-horn, is a small moth of the family Pyralidae.

== Distribution ==
It is found in European regions, including the British Isles, and East Asia (e.g. China, Japan, South Korea and Taiwan).

== Description ==
The wingspan is 26–30 mm. The forewings are light crimson or pink, sometimes much mixed with grey or dark grey, a whitish, greyish-ochreous, or grey costal streak; a broad ochreous-yellowish dorsal suffusion. Hindwings grey, slightly rosy-tinged. The larva is bronzy-blackish, with ten indistinct greenish lines; a whitish lateral spot on 3, including a black dot; head and plate of 2 black : amongst web on Lotus.

The adult moth flies in one generation by the end of June to August. It is easily disturbed on short grassland, flies from dusk onwards, and is attracted to light and sugar.

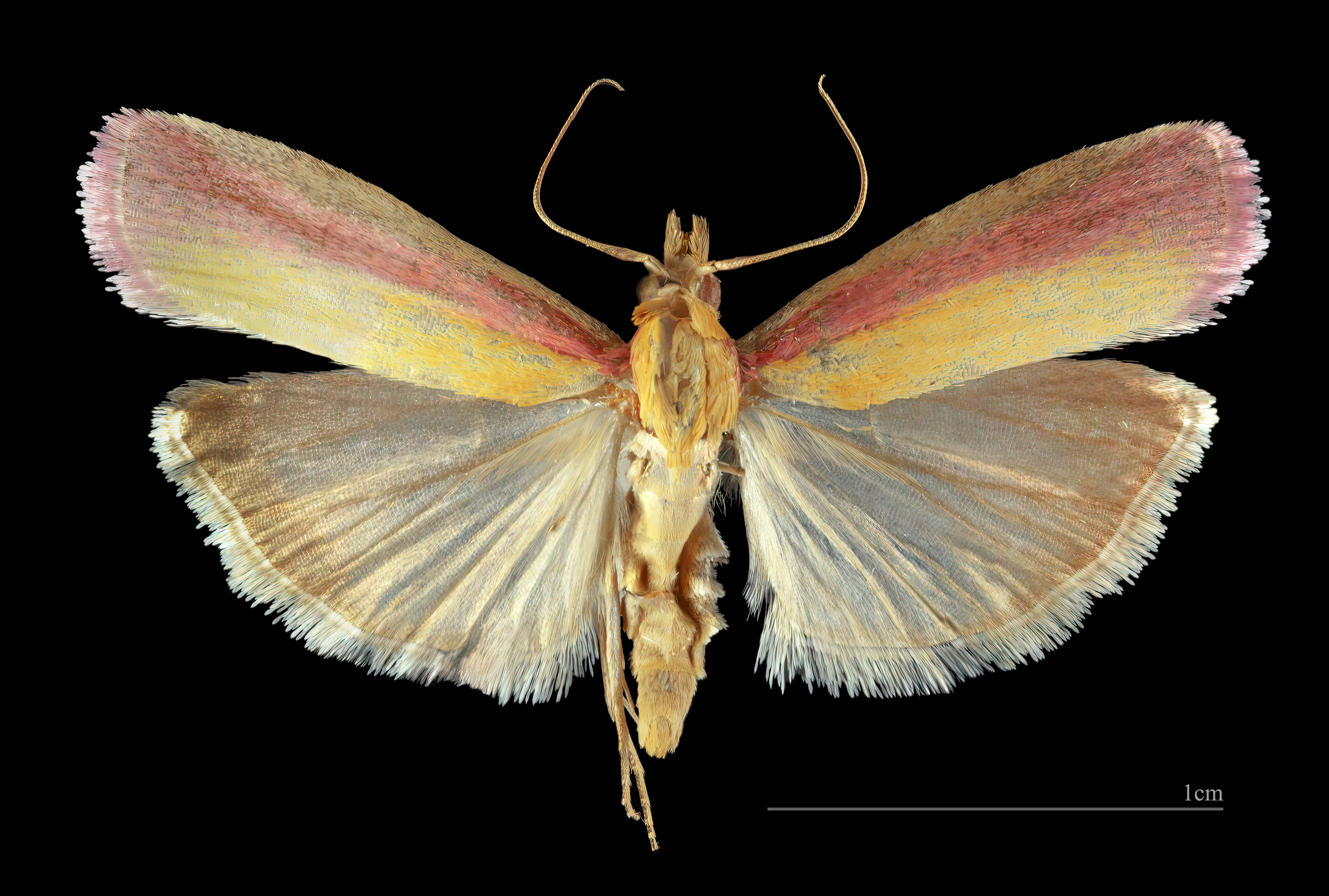
Oncocera semirubella♂

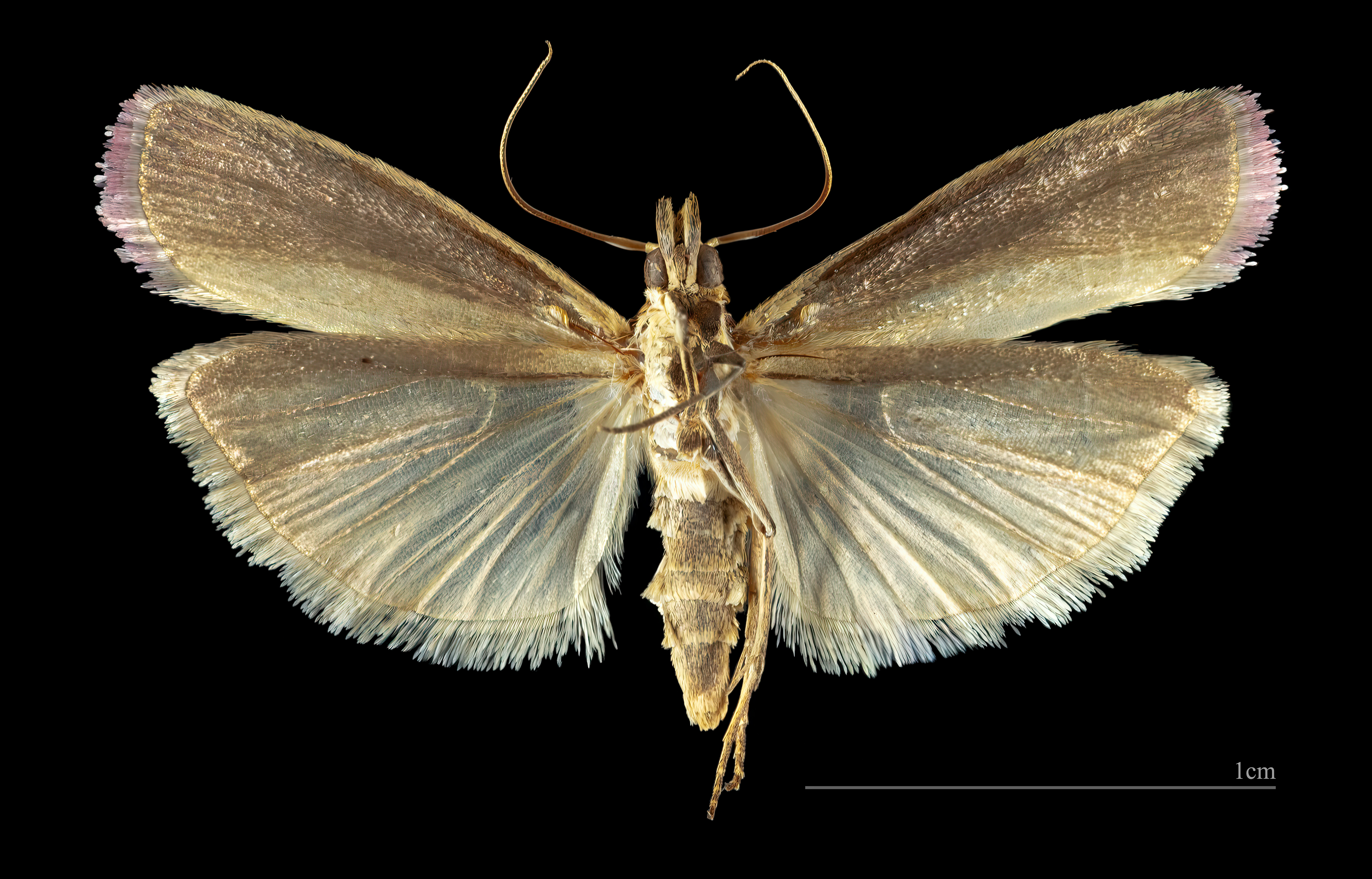
Oncocera semirubella♂ △
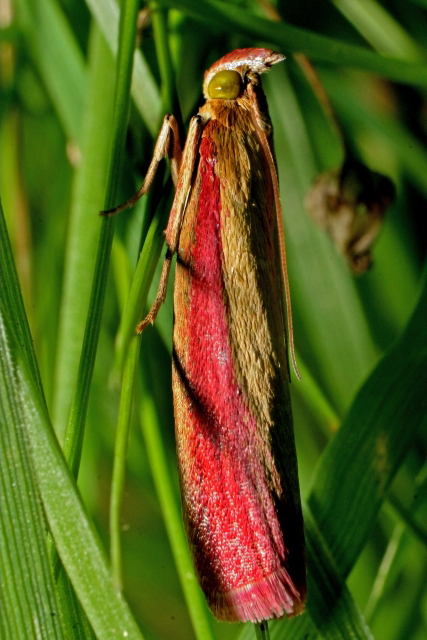

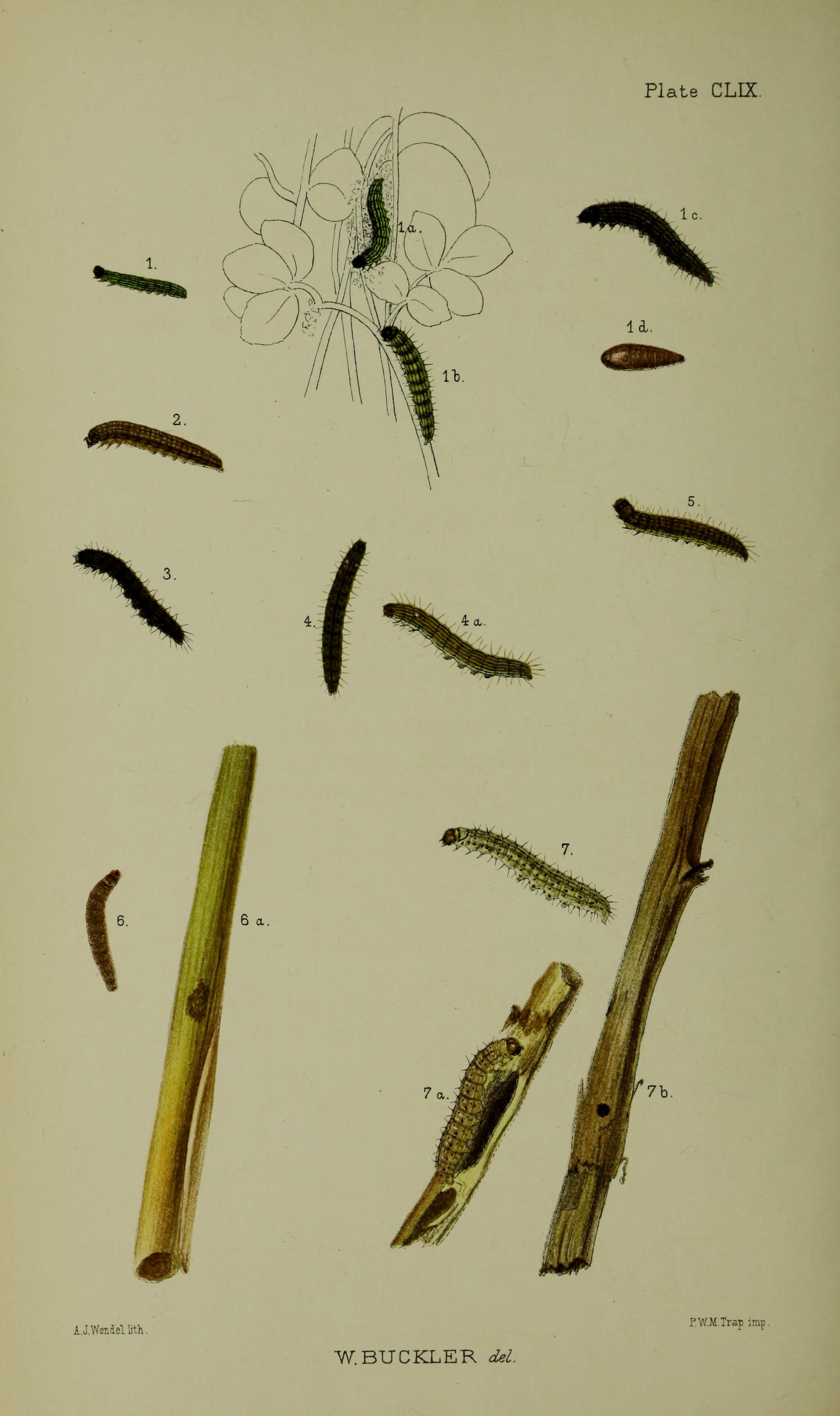
Figs.1, 1a, 1b, 1 c larvae in various stages 1d pupa

== Biology ==
The larvae feed on bird's-foot trefoil (Lotus corniculatus), white clover, Ononis species, horseshoe vetch and Medicago species.

== Notes ==
1. The flight season refers to Belgium and the Netherlands; this may vary in other parts of its range.
