= Alophe =

Alophe Temporal range: Early Miocene

Scientific classification
- Domain: Eukaryota
- Kingdom: Animalia
- Phylum: Chordata
- Class: Mammalia
- Order: Primates
- Suborder: Haplorhini
- Infraorder: Simiiformes
- Parvorder: Catarrhini
- Superfamily: Cercopithecoidea
- Genus: †Alophe
- Species: †A. metios

Binomial name
- †Alophe metios (Rasmussen et al. 2019)

Synonyms
- Alophia Rasmussen et al. 2019

Extinct monkey from early Miocene Kenya

Alophe metios was an early cercopithecoid monkey that lived in Kenya about 22 million years ago. It is known from jaw fragments and teeth. Although it was more closely related to modern cercopithecids (Old World monkeys) than to apes, it had not evolved some features shared by crown cercopithecids and their nearest relatives, such as bilophodont molars.

The monkey was originally named Alophia metios, but the genus Alophia was already taken by a moth, prompting the new name Alophe.
