= Alophia combustella =

Scientific classification
- Kingdom: Animalia
- Phylum: Arthropoda
- Class: Insecta
- Order: Lepidoptera
- Family: Pyralidae
- Subfamily: Phycitinae
- Tribe: Phycitini
- Genus: Alophia; Ragonot, 1893
- Species: A. combustella

Binomial name
- Alophia combustella (Herrich-Schäffer, 1852)

Synonyms
- Pempelia combustella Herrich-Schäffer, 1852; Oncocera combustella

Species of moth

Alophia is a monotypic snout moth genus described by Émile Louis Ragonot in 1893. Its single species, Alophia combustella, was described by Gottlieb August Wilhelm Herrich-Schäffer in 1852. It is found in Spain, Portugal, France, Italy, Sardinia, Sicily, Greece, North Macedonia, Croatia, Hungary, Romania, Ukraine and southern Russia.

== Taxonomy ==
The genus is sometimes listed as a subgenus of Oncocera.
