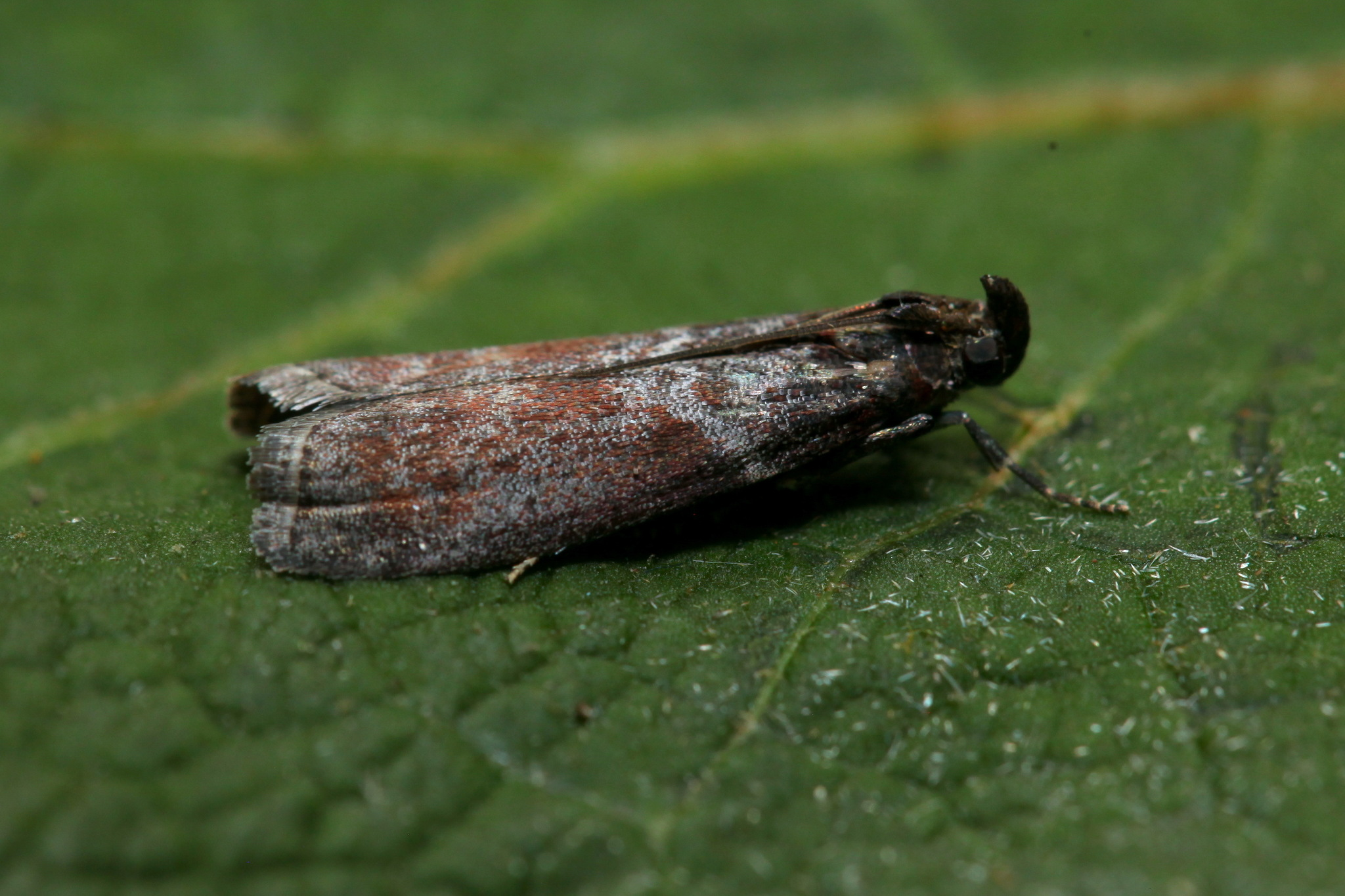
- Laodamia faecella, Russia

Scientific classification
- Domain: Eukaryota
- Kingdom: Animalia
- Phylum: Arthropoda
- Class: Insecta
- Order: Lepidoptera
- Family: Pyralidae
- Tribe: Phycitini
- Genus: Laodamia; Ragonot, 1888

= Laodamia (moth) =

Genus of moths

Laodamia is a genus of snout moths found in the Palearctic. It is sometimes listed as a subgenus of Oncocera.

== Species ==
- Laodamia affinis Balinsky, 1994
- Laodamia bibasella Joannis, 1927
- Laodamia combustella (Herrich-Schäffer, 1855)
- Laodamia cristinae Gastón, 2014
- Laodamia dubia Balinsky, 1994
- Laodamia eulepidella (Hampson, 1896)
- Laodamia faecella (Zeller, 1839)
- Laodamia floridana Joannis, 1927
- Laodamia glaucocephalis Balinsky, 1994
- Laodamia grisella Balinsky, 1994
- Laodamia homotypa Balinsky, 1994
- Laodamia inermis Balinsky, 1994
- Laodamia infausta Ragonot, 1893
- Laodamia injucunda Balinsky, 1994
- Laodamia leucosticta Joannis, 1927
- Laodamia mikadella Ragonot, 1893
- Laodamia natalensis (Ragonot, 1888)
- Laodamia oenochreella Ragonot, 1888
- Laodamia quilicii (Guillermet, 2007)
- Laodamia scalaris Joannis, 1927
- Laodamia similis Balinsky, 1994
- Laodamia spiculata Balinsky, 1994
- Laodamia squamata Balinsky, 1994
- Laodamia submundellalis Caradja, 1927
- Laodamia zoetendalensis Balinsky, 1994
