= Laodamia eulepidella =

Scientific classification
- Kingdom: Animalia
- Phylum: Arthropoda
- Class: Insecta
- Order: Lepidoptera
- Family: Pyralidae
- Subfamily: Phycitinae
- Tribe: Phycitini
- Genus: Laodamia
- Species: L. eulepidella

Binomial name
- Laodamia eulepidella (Hampson, 1896)

Synonyms
- Phycita eulepidella Hampson, 1896; Phycita jasminophaga Hampson, 1896; Phycita recondita Turner, 1904; Phycita similis Whalley, 1962

Species of moth

Laodamia eulepidella is a moth of the family Pyralidae first described by George Hampson in 1896. It is found in western Malaysia, Australia and probably in Sri Lanka.

This species is classified as a member of the genus Laodamia in "Global Information System on Pyraloidea" as of 2024, but it is also sometimes considered a member of the genus Phycita.

Its caterpillars are known to feed on Jasminum sambac and Ixora species.
