= Marc Meyer =

Marc R. Meyer is an archaeologist and anthropologist who is notable for his excavation of, and research into, the remains of fossil hominids such as Australopithecines and early genus Homo. He currently lectures at Chaffey College, Rancho Cucamonga, CA.

== Doctoral dissertation ==
- Meyer, Marc R (2005). Functional biology of the Homo erectus axial skeleton from Dmanisi, Georgia (PhD Thesis). University of Pennsylvania. pp. 1–567. Archived from the original on April 23, 2006.

== Publications ==
- Marc R. Meyer, Jason P. Jung, Jeffrey K. Spear, Isabella Fx Araiza, Julia Galway-Witham, Scott A. Williams, 2023. Knuckle-walking in Sahelanthropus? Locomotor inferences from the ulnae of fossil hominins and other hominoids. Journal of Human Evolution, 179, Article 103355.
- Araiza, I., Meyer, M.R., Williams, S.A., 2021. Is ulna curvature in the StW 573 ('Little Foot') Australopithecus natural or pathological? Journal of Human Evolution 151, 102927.
- Hermes, T.R., Doumani Dupuy, P.N., Henry, E., Meyer, M.R., Mar'yashev, A.N., Frachetti, M.D. (2021) The multi-period settlement "Dali" in southeastern Kazakhstan: Bronze Age institutional dynamics along the Inner Asian Mountain Corridor. Asian Perspectives (in press).
- Williams, S.A. Prang, T.C., Meyer, M.R., Russo, G.A., Shapiro, L.J. (2020) Reevaluating bipedalism in Danuvius. Nature 586, E1-E3.
- García-Martínez, D., Bastir, M., Villa, C., García-Río, F., Torres-Sánchez, I., Recheis, W., Barash, A., Khonsari, R.H., O'Higgins, P., Meyer, M.R., Heuzé, Y. (2020) Late subadult ontogeny and adult aging of the human thorax reveals divergent growth trajectories between sexes. Scientific Reports 10, 10737.
- Meyer, M.R., Williams, S.A., Fong, M. (2020) Anatomic extremes of the postcranial axial skeleton of Australopithecus and Paranthropus robustus. American Journal of Physical Anthropology 171(S69):186.
- Jaye, S., Cortez, V., Meyer, M.R., Williams, S.A. (2020) Functional anatomy of the caudalmost sacrum in Australopithecus afarensis, Australopithecus sediba and Homo erectus. American Journal of Physical Anthropology 171(S69):132.
- Meyer, M.R., & Williams, S.A. (2019). "The spine of early Pleistocene Homo". In E. Been, A. Gómez-Olivencia, & P. Kramer (Eds.), Spinal Evolution (pp. 153-183). Cham: Springer.
- Williams, S.A., & Meyer, M.R. (2019). "The spine of Australopithecus". In E. Been, A. Gómez-Olivencia, & P. Kramer (Eds.), Spinal Evolution (pp. 125-151). Cham: Springer.
- Meyer, M.R., & Williams, S.A. (2019). "Earliest axial fossils from the genus Australopithecus". Journal of Human Evolution, 132, 189-214.
- Williams, S.A., Prang, T.C., Meyer, M.R., Ostrofsky, K., Nalley, T., et al. (2019). "A nearly complete lower back of Australopithecus sediba". American Journal of Physical Anthropology, 168, 269-270.
- Meyer, M.R. & Williams, S.A. (2019). "4.2 Ma Australopithecus anamensis axial remains: the oldest australopith vertebrae in the fossil record". American Journal of Physical Anthropology 168: 165.
- Meyer, M.R., Williams, S.A., García-Martínez, D., Bastir, M. (2018). "Toward Solving the Puzzle of Thorax Shape Variation Among Early Hominins." American Journal of Physical Anthropology 165: 176.
- Williams, S. A.; Meyer, M.R.; et al. (2018). "The Vertebrae, Ribs, and Sternum of Australopithecus sediba". PaleoAnthropology. 156: 233.
- Williams, S. A.; et al. (2018). "Relative size and scaling of the lumbo-sacral joint in fossil hominins: Implications for function and phylogeny". American Journal of Physical Anthropology. 165: 301. doi:10.1002/ajpa.23489. hdl:11336/130816.
- Hawks, J.; et al. (2017). "New fossil remains of Homo naledi from the Lesedi Chamber, South Africa". eLife. 6 e24232. doi:10.7554/eLife.24232. PMC 5423776. PMID 28483039.
- Meyer, M.R.; Williams, S.A.; Schmid, P.; Churchill, S.E.; Berger, L.R. (2017). "The cervical spine of Australopithecus sediba". Journal of Human Evolution. 104: 32–49. doi:10.1016/j.jhevol.2017.01.001. PMID 28317555.
- Meyer, M.R.; Williams, S.A. (2017). "How did early hominins hold their heads? New evidence on head posture from the australopith cervical spine". American Journal of Physical Anthropology. 162: 286–287. doi:10.1002/ajpa.23210. PMID 28321879.
- Bastir, M.; García-Martínez, D.; Williams, S.A.; Meyer, M.R.; et al. (2017). "Geometric morphometrics of hominoid thoraces and its bearing for reconstructing the ribcage of H. naledi". American Journal of Physical Anthropology. 162: 111–112. doi:10.1002/ajpa.23210. PMID 28321879.
- Berger, Lee R.; Tafforeau, Paul; Augustine, Tanya; Odes, Edward J.; Churchill, Steven E.; Smilg, Jacqueline S.; Meyer, Marc R.; Steyn, Maryna; Williams, Scott A.; Randolph-Quinney, Patrick S. (2016). "Osteogenic tumour in Australopithecus sediba: Earliest hominin evidence for neoplastic disease". South African Journal of Science. 112 (7/8): 7. doi:10.17159/sajs.2016/20150470.
- Meyer, Marc R. (2016). "The Cervical Vertebrae of KSD-VP-1/1". The Postcranial Anatomy of Australopithecus afarensis. Vertebrate Paleobiology and Paleoanthropology. pp. 63–111. doi:10.1007/978-94-017-7429-1_5. ISBN 978-94-017-7427-7.
- Haile-Selassie, Y.; Latimer, B.; Lovejoy, C.O.; Melillo, S.M.; Meyer, M.R. (2016). "Conclusion: Implications of KSD-VP-1/1 for Early Hominin Paleobiology and Insights into the Chimpanzee/Human Last Common Ancestor". In Haile-Selassie, Y.; Su, D. (eds.). The Postcranial Anatomy of Australopithecus afarensis. Vertebrate Paleobiology and Paleoanthropology. Netherlands: Springer. pp. 179–87. doi:10.1007/978-94-017-7429-1_9. ISBN 978-94-017-7429-1.
- Meyer, Marc R.; Haeusler, Martin (2015). "Spinal cord evolution in early Homo". Journal of Human Evolution. 88: 43–53. doi:10.1016/j.jhevol.2015.09.001. PMID 26553817.
- Berger, Lee R; Hawks, John; De Ruiter, Darryl J; Churchill, Steven E; Schmid, Peter; Delezene, Lucas K; Kivell, Tracy L; Garvin, Heather M; Williams, Scott A; Desilva, Jeremy M; Skinner, Matthew M; Musiba, Charles M; Cameron, Noel; Holliday, Trenton W; Harcourt-Smith, William; Ackermann, Rebecca R; Bastir, Markus; Bogin, Barry; Bolter, Debra; Brophy, Juliet; Cofran, Zachary D; Congdon, Kimberly A; Deane, Andrew S; Dembo, Mana; Drapeau, Michelle; Elliott, Marina C; Feuerriegel, Elen M; Garcia-Martinez, Daniel; Green, David J; et al. (2015). "Homo naledi, a new species of the genus Homo from the Dinaledi Chamber, South Africa". eLife. 4. doi:10.7554/eLife.09560. PMC 4559886. PMID 26354291.
- Meyer, Marc R.; Williams, Scott A.; Smith, Michael P.; Sawyer, Gary J. (2015). "Lucy's back: Reassessment of fossils associated with the A.L. 288-1 vertebral column". Journal of Human Evolution. 85: 174–80. doi:10.1016/j.jhevol.2015.05.007. PMID 26058822. S2CID 10410978.
- Meyer, Marc R; Lewis, Jason E.; Fong, Michael; Holloway, Ralph L (January 2014). "Global patterns of human orbit size: Implications for Neandertals". in "Abstracts - AAPA Presentations". American Journal of Physical Anthropology. 153: 64–283. 2014. doi:10.1002/ajpa.22488.
- Meyer, M.R. (2012). "Functional anatomy of the thoracic vertebrae in early Homo." American Journal of Physical Anthropology S(52): 214.
- Lewis, Jason E.; Degusta, David; Meyer, Marc R.; Monge, Janet M.; Mann, Alan E.; Holloway, Ralph L. (2011). "The Mismeasure of Science: Stephen Jay Gould versus Samuel George Morton on Skulls and Bias". PLOS Biology. 9 (6) e1001071. doi:10.1371/journal.pbio.1001071. PMC 3110184. PMID 21666803.
- Shearer, B.M. and Meyer, M.R. (2011) Sexual dimorphism in the geometry of the distal humeral condyle. American Journal of Physical Anthropology S(46): 201.
- Meyer, M.R. (2008). "Homo_erectus Skeletal indications for distance locomotion in early Homo erectus." American Journal of Physical Anthropology 135(S46): 155.
- Chang, M.L. and Meyer, M.R. (2007). "Functional morphology of the Neandertal nose: tracing the evolution of putative adaptive characters in a phylogenetic context." American Journal of Physical Anthropology S(44): 86.
- Meyer, M.R., D. Lordkipanidze, et al. (2006). "Language and empathy in Homo erectus: behaviors suggested by a modern spinal cord from Dmanisi, but not Nariokotome." PaleoAnthropology 2006(A): 20.
- Meyer, M.R., D. Lordkipanidze, et al. (2006). "The anatomical capacity for spoken language in Homo erectus." American Journal of Physical Anthropology 129(S42): 130.
- Meyer, M.R.; Chang, M.; et al. (2005). "Functional morphology of the Neandertal nose". PaleoAnthropology. 2005: A17.
- Van Arsdale, A.; Meyer, M.R. (2005). "Intraspecific variation in sexual dimorphism". American Journal of Physical Anthropology. 126: 211.
- Meyer, M.R. (2005). "Functional Biology of the Homo erectus axial Skeleton from Dmanisi, Georgia. Doctoral Dissertation in Anthropology. Philadelphia, University of Pennsylvania: 601.
- Van Arsdale, A.; Meyer, M.R (2004). "Patterns of sexual dimorphism in Homo". American Journal of Physical Anthropology. 123: 199–200.
- Meyer, M.R., J. Blumenfeld, et al. (2004). "Geographic patterns of nasal morphology in Homo." American Journal of Physical Anthropology 123(S38): 146-147.
- Meyer, M.R. (2003). "Vertebrae and language ability in early hominids." PaleoAnthropology 1: 20-21.
- Meyer, M.R. (2003) "The evolution of human brain size". IRCS/CCN Brain and Language Series. Philadelphia Institute of Cognitive Science.
- Monge, J.M. and Meyer, M.R. (2002) "A reassessment of human cranial volume using the 19th Century Morton Cranial Collection". IRCS/CCN Brain & Language Series, University of Pennsylvania, Institute for Research in Cognitive Science & Center for Cognitive Neuroscience.
