= Cova Foradà =

Archaeological site with remains of Neanderthals in the Province of Valencia, Spain

- Interactive map of Cova Foradà
- 38.8831°N 0.0907°W
- Type: Intermittent settlement
- Periods: Middle Paleolithic – Bronze Age
- Region: Province of Valencia

Cova Foradà (or Cova Foradada) is an archaeological site consisting of a cave with remains of Neanderthals near Oliva, in the Province of Valencia, Spain. The most complete skeleton of a Neanderthal ever found on the Iberian peninsula was found there in 2010. One of the Neanderthals whose remains were found in the cave used a toothpick to alleviate pain in his teeth caused by periodontal disease and dental wear.

== Location and description ==
The karst cave is located 5 kilometres (3.1 mi) southeast of the village of Oliva, at 3.5 kilometres (2.2 mi) from the coast of the Mediterranean, and archaeological excavations have taken place since 1977. The cave is found in a low hill, one of a group of hills called the Muntanyetes de Oliva, the last part of the Serra de Mustalla before the floodplain that ends at the coast. It has been occupied since the Middle Paleolithic, including in the Mousterian and Mesolithic periods, and in the Bronze Age. Its environment was rich and varied, with mountains on one side and lagoons on the other.

== Archaeological finds ==
A maxilla (almost complete, with a number of teeth), a molar, a fibula, and four fragments of a cranium belonging to two humans were found between 2000 and 2003, in what appeared to be a layer from the Mousterian. All fragments except for the molar were from an adult, who died at between 35 and 45 years old; the molar was from a child of around 2.5 years old. The maxilla showed periodontal disease and heavy dental wear, which must have caused considerable pain; there was a significant gap (8.05 mm for the canine) between the teeth and the alveolar bone. The person attempted to alleviate the discomfort with a toothpick, as evidenced by two grooves on the distal surface of two of the remaining teeth: "the habit of using a tool to pick the teeth may be considered early evidence of medical treatment to alleviate sore gums".

In 2010, in further excavations on the same spot where the maxilla was found, an almost complete skeleton of a Neanderthal was found, the most complete skeleton (with the bones still attached to the spine) ever found on the Iberian peninsula.

In 2019, it was reported that archeologists found a necklace featuring eagle claws, which suggests symbolic purposes.

Studies of the food remains in the location, published in 2020, indicated habitual harvesting of seafood during the Aurignacian period. This showed particularly extensive consumption of mussels, limpets, and top-shells, alongside the presence of shell ornaments.

== Research ==
Excavations have been led by José Aparicio Pérez, for the archaeological department of the Provincial Government of Valencia.

== See also ==
- List of Neanderthal sites
