= Nanopithecus =

Nanopithecus Temporal range: Early Pliocene

Scientific classification
- Kingdom: Animalia
- Phylum: Chordata
- Class: Mammalia
- Order: Primates
- Family: Cercopithecidae
- Subfamily: Cercopithecinae
- Tribe: Cercopithecini
- Genus: †Nanopithecus; Plavcan et al., 2019
- Species: †N. browni

Binomial name
- †Nanopithecus browni Plavcan et al., 2019

Extinct genus of monkey

Nanopithecus is an extinct genus of monkey that lived in Africa during the Zanclean stage of the Pliocene epoch.

== Evolution ==
The diminutive size of Nanopithecus relative to the extant Miopithecus suggests either that dwarfing in the guenon lineage occurred at least twice independently or that it occurred very early on in their evolution.
