= Tanya M. Smith =

Evolutionary biologist and researcher

Tanya Smith
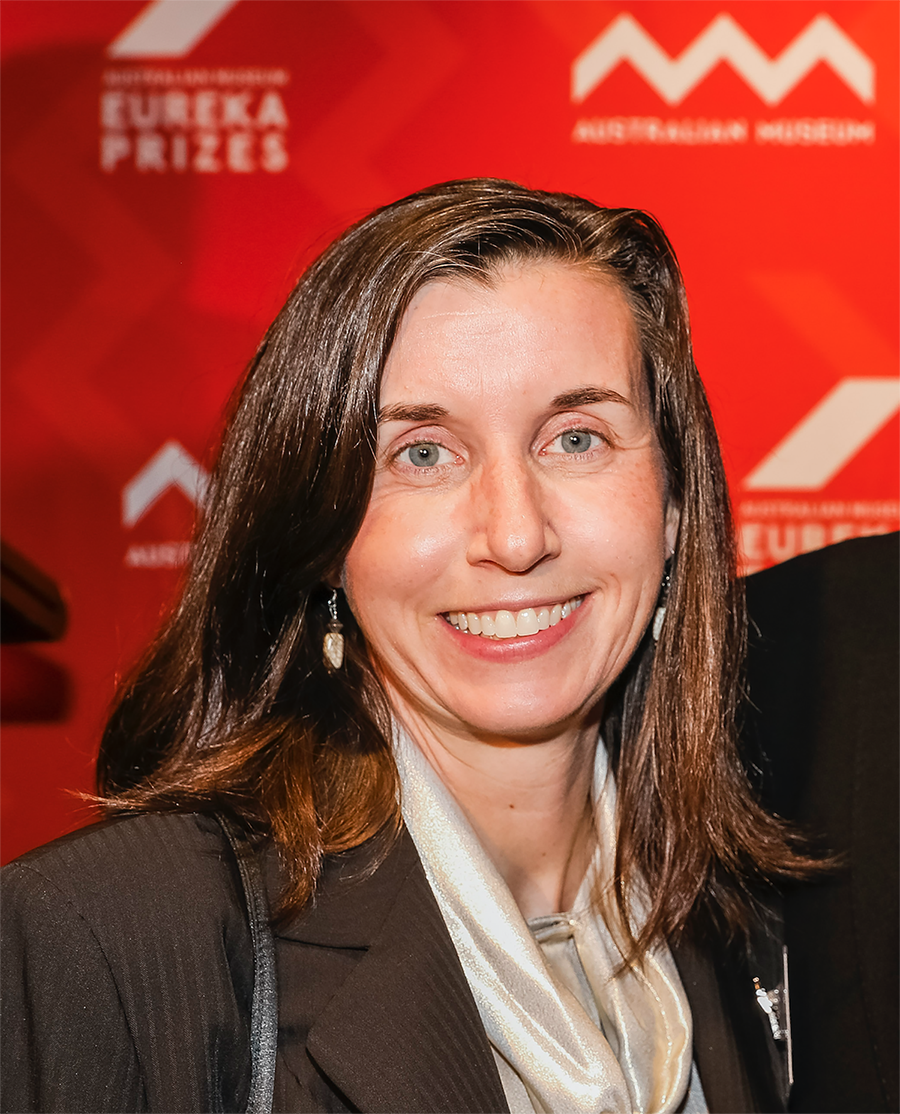
- Smith at the Australian Museum's 2019 Eureka Awards Gala in Sydney, Australia
- Occupation: Professor

Academic work
- Discipline: Biological Anthropology
- Sub-discipline: Human Evolutionary Biology
- Institutions: Australian Research Centre for Human Evolution (ARCHE), Griffith University

Tanya M. Smith is a human evolutionary biologist, and professor at the Australian Research Centre for Human Evolution, Griffith University (Queensland, Australia).

== Education ==
Smith obtained her BSc Hons in Biology at the State University of New York (SUNY) at Geneseo in 1997, followed by her MA at Stony Brook University in 2002, and PhD in the Interdepartmental Doctoral Program in Anthropological Sciences at Stony Brook University in 2004. She received the Stony Brook University President's Award for Distinguished Doctoral Students in 2005.

== Career and research ==
Following her PhD, Smith was a postdoctoral fellow at the Max Planck Institute for Evolutionary Anthropology from 2004 - 2005, then research scientist at Max Planck Institute for Evolutionary Anthropology from 2006 - 2008. In 2008 she took up a position as assistant professor at Harvard University and from 2012 - 2016 associate professor. During her time at Harvard she was also a fellow at the Radcliffe Institute for Advanced Study 2013 - 2014, and visiting scholar at the University of California, Berkeley 2015 - 2017. She moved to Griffith University as an associate professor in 2016, where she is affiliated with the Environmental Futures Research Institute, and Griffith Centre for Social Cultural Research. In 2020, the Australian Research Council funded her Future Fellowship project "Illuminating behavioural and environmental influences on human development".

Smith works broadly in the area of human evolutionary biology. Her research focuses on dental development and growth using histology, elemental chemistry, and advanced imaging techniques, and how dental tissues can be used to resolve taxonomic, phylogenetic, and developmental questions about great apes and humans. She works primarily on tooth microstructure, including the use of juvenile dentition for determining age at death, and how dental development correlates with aspects of an individual's life history, growth and reproduction. Her research has led to a major revision in the understanding of understand dental development in chimpanzees, and has demonstrated that living and fossil Homo sapiens have a prolonged period of dental development in comparison to Neanderthals and earlier hominins.

In 2018 she published her first book, The Tales Teeth Tell: Development, Evolution, Behavior, with The MIT Press. A Chinese simplified character translation of the book is published in May 2022.
