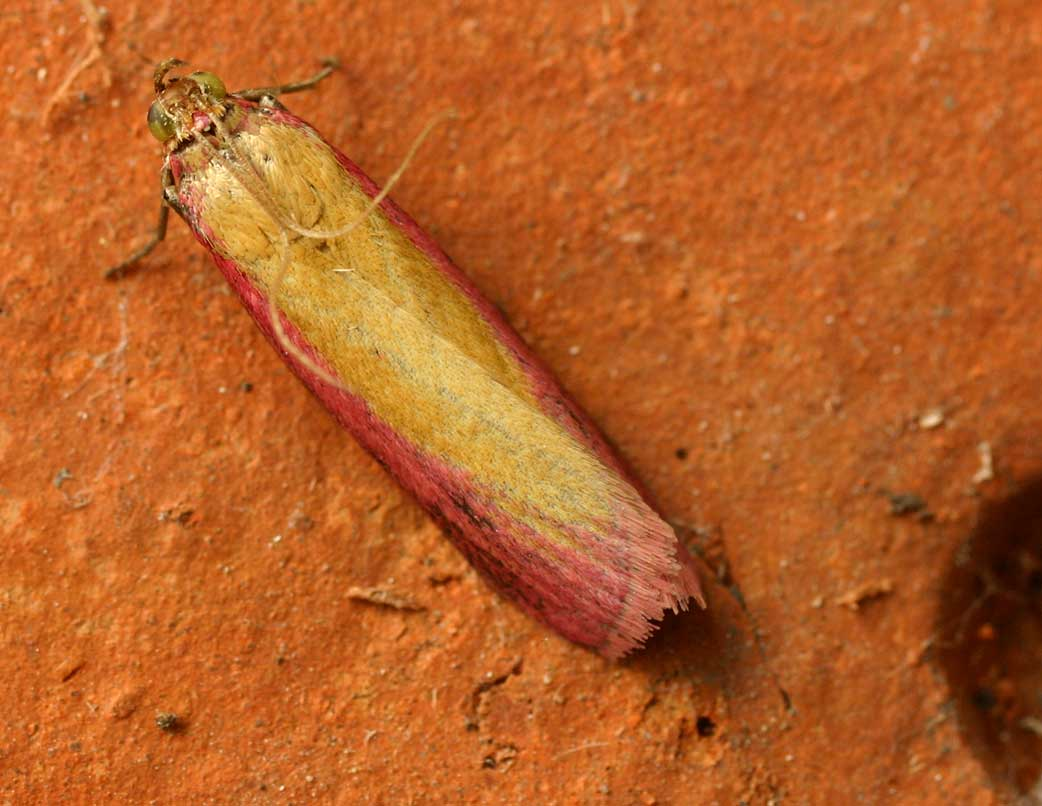

Scientific classification
- Domain: Eukaryota
- Kingdom: Animalia
- Phylum: Arthropoda
- Class: Insecta
- Order: Lepidoptera
- Family: Pyralidae
- Tribe: Phycitini
- Genus: Oncocera; Stephens, 1829

Synonyms
- Pollichia Roesler, 1980

= Oncocera =

Genus of moths

Oncocera is a genus of snout moths. It was described by James Francis Stephens in 1829.

== Species ==
- Oncocera affinis Balinsky, 1994
- Oncocera argentilavella Hampson, 1901
- Oncocera bibasella de Joannis, 1927
- Oncocera cenochreella Ragonot, 1888
- Oncocera dubia Balinsky, 1994
- Oncocera faecella Zeller, 1839
- Oncocera flavitinctella Ragonot, 1893
- Oncocera floridana de Joannis, 1927
- Oncocera franki Caradja, 1931
- Oncocera furvicostella Ragonot, 1893
- Oncocera glaucocephalis Balinsky, 1994
- Oncocera grisella Balinsky, 1994
- Oncocera griseosparsella Ragonot, 1893
- Oncocera homotypa Balinsky, 1994
- Oncocera horrens Balinsky, 1994
- Oncocera hortensis Balinsky, 1994
- Oncocera ignicephalis Balinsky, 1994
- Oncocera inermis Balinsky, 1994
- Oncocera infausta Ragonot, 1893
- Oncocera injucunda Balinsky, 1994
- Oncocera karkloofensis Balinsky, 1994
- Oncocera laetanella Lucas, 1937
- Oncocera leucosticta de Joannis, 1927
- Oncocera lugubris Balinsky, 1994
- Oncocera mikadella Ragonot, 1893
- Oncocera mundellalis Walker, 1863
- Oncocera natalensis Ragonot, 1888
- Oncocera nigerrima Balinsky, 1994
- Oncocera nonplagella Balinsky, 1994
- Oncocera ochreomelanella Ragonot, 1888
- Oncocera polygraphella de Joannis, 1927
- Oncocera psammathella Hampson, 1926
- Oncocera pulchra Balinsky, 1994
- Oncocera quilicii Guilletmet, 2007
- Oncocera salisburyensis Balinsky, 1994
- Oncocera sarniensis Balinsky, 1994
- Oncocera scalaris de Joannis, 1927
- Oncocera semirubella (Scopoli, 1763)
- Oncocera similis Balinsky, 1994
- Oncocera sinicolella Caradja, 1926
- Oncocera spiculata Balinsky, 1994
- Oncocera spissa Balinsky, 1994
- Oncocera squamata Balinsky, 1994
- Oncocera submundellalis Caradja, 1927
- Oncocera tahlaella Dumont, 1932
- Oncocera umbrosella Erschoff, 1876
- Oncocera zoetendalensis Balinsky, 1994
