= Mary Marzke =

American anthropologist (died 2020)

Mary W. Marzke was an American anthropologist. Her research focuses on the evolution of the hominin hand.

== Early life and education ==
Mary Marzke was born Mary Walpole in Oakland, California. While in middle school and high school, ski trips with her family friends the McCowns sparked an interest in anthropology as both Professor and Mrs. McCown were physical anthropologists. Professor McCown later went on to serve as one of her Ph.D. supervisors. In 1959, she graduated from the University of California, Berkeley with an A.B. in Anthropology. Following this, she attained her M.A. in anthropology from Columbia University in New York in 1961. Marzke returned to the University of California, Berkeley to earn her Ph.D. in anthropology, completing it in 1964. Her Ph.D. supervisors at the University of California, Berkeley were Professors Theodore McCown and Sherwood Washburn. Marzke died on September 3, 2020, surrounded by family.

== Career ==
Markze began her teaching career by lecturing, then instructing at Hunter Brown College (now Lehman college) in 1963. She then lectured at the University of North Carolina (Chapel Hill) from 1967 to 1969. The following decade, she worked as an acting assistant professor at the University of California from 1976 to 1977. In 1978, she began working at the Arizona State University as an adjunct visiting professor. Markze has worked at ASU since then, with a 9-year break from 1986 to 1995 when she worked as an anatomist at the Primate Foundation of Arizona. Markze has been a professor at ASU since 2004, most recently teaching courses on primate anatomy and fossil hominins.

Apart from teaching, Markze has done an extensive amount of research throughout her career, with a “special focus on the evolution of the hominin hand and bipedality.” Markze's research involves “extensive dissections, electromyography, kinematic analysis of joint angle displacement and tendon excursion, and stereophotogrammetry and laser digitizing for 3-D analysis of joint surface areas, angles and curvatures.

Markze has made a number of discoveries including her work that has demonstrated the links between precision gripping, tool behaviors, and hand morphology. Markze used experimental manufacturing of prehistoric hominin tools, behavior studies of chimpanzees, and morphological analysis, to help discern which pre-modern human species were capable of tool-making.

In 2000, Markze conducted a morphological and biomechanical analysis of the early hominin hand found at Olduvai Gorge. Markze's research also addressed “the potential of fossil hominid hands for one-handed firm precision grips and fine precision manoeuvering movements, both of which are essential for habitual and effective tool making and tool use.” In 2008, Markze's research concluded that "further derived changes to the hands of other hominins such as modern humans and Neandertals did not evolve until after 2.5 Ma and possibly even later than 1.5 Ma." Markze also pioneered the use of 3DGM methods to investigate the evolutionary history of the carpal bones of the hand.

She has appeared on the PBS show Scientific American Frontiers in 2000 in the episode "Life's Really Big Questions".
