= Aseanpithecus =

Aseanpithecus Temporal range: Bartonian

Scientific classification
- Kingdom: Animalia
- Phylum: Chordata
- Class: Mammalia
- Order: Primates
- Genus: †Aseanpithecus
- Species: †A. myanmarensis

Binomial name
- †Aseanpithecus myanmarensis Jaeger et al., 2019

Extinct genus of anthropoid primate

Aseanpithecus is an extinct monotypic genus of anthropoid primate that lived in Southeast Asia during the Bartonian stage of the Eocene epoch.

== Etymology ==
The generic name Aseanpithecus is derived from ASEAN, the political and economic union of Southeast Asian countries, and from the Latin word pithecus, which means monkey. The specific epithet of the type species, Aseanpithecus myanmarensis, references Myanmar, the country in which the fossil was found.
