= Tzibte Yux =

Archaeological site in southern Belize

- Tzib Te Yux; Tzib'te Yux
- Longitudinal diagram of Tzibte Yux / excavation units 1–9 labelled / 2019 Prufer et al. / via PLOS ONE

- 16.22918°N 89.09335°W
- Type: Rock shelter
- Periods: Preceramic
- Cultures: Palaeoindian
- Location: Rio Blanco National Park, Toledo, Belize
- Region: Yucatan Peninsula

History
- Built: 10500 BC
- Abandoned: 6500 BC

Site notes
- Length: 121 ft (37 m)
- Width: 14.8 ft (4.5 m)
- Excavation dates: 2012–2015
- Archaeologists: Keith Prufer / Uxbenka Archaeological Project
- Discovered: 2009
- Owner: Public
- Management: Institute of Archaeology
- Public access: Limited

Tzibte Yux, Tzib Te Yux, or Tzib'te Yux, is a Preceramic rock shelter and archaeological site in the Rio Blanco National Park, Toledo, Belize. It is thought to have been occupied by Palaeoindian settlers during 10500 BC – 6500 BC.

== Description ==
Tzibte Yux is a rockshelter measuring some 121 ft (37 m) long and 14.8 ft (4.5 m) wide at its widest point. Its entrance, protected by a silicified limestone and conglomerate overhang, sits some 26 ft (8 m) above Blue Creek during the dry season, though this decreases to less than 6 ft (2 m) during the wet season. Its floor is relatively flat and composed of sediments, predominantly jute snail shells deposited by former pre-Columbian inhabitants.

Fishtail- and Lowe-style stemmed bifacial points have been recovered from Tzibte Yux, the former dated 10450 cal BC – 10085 cal BC, the latter 8275 cal BC – 6650 cal BC. Human remains have also been recovered from the rock shelter.

== Study ==
Tzibte Yux was discovered by the Uxbenka Archaeological Project in 2009. Subsequently, nine blocks or units, ie Units 1–9, covering some 194 ft^{2} (18 m^{2}) of the rock shelter's floor, were excavated to a mean depth of some 2.5 ft (0.75 m) during 2012–2015. A piece of charcoal found at the bottom of a red clay layer in Unit 1, some 23 in (58 cm) below the floor's surface, was dated to 10571 cal BC – 10526 cal BC. Most material in other units produced dates within 10500 cal BC – 6500 cal BC, though Unit 7 yielded a later date of 890 cal AD – 975 cal AD at 18.5 in (47 cm) below surface.
