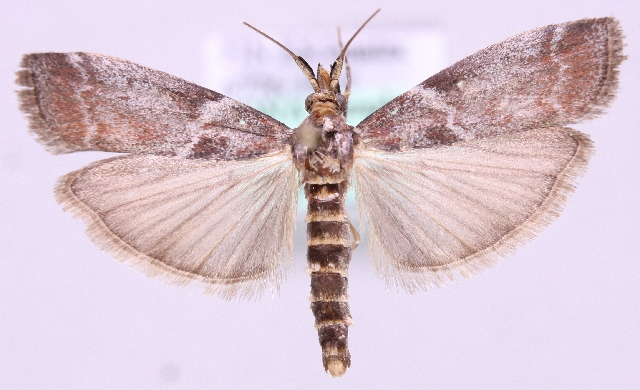

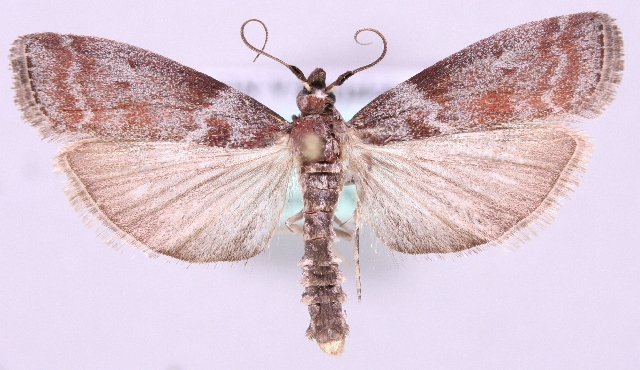

Scientific classification
- Domain: Eukaryota
- Kingdom: Animalia
- Phylum: Arthropoda
- Class: Insecta
- Order: Lepidoptera
- Family: Pyralidae
- Genus: Laodamia
- Species: L. faecella

Binomial name
- Laodamia faecella (Zeller, 1839)

Synonyms
- Pempelia faecella Zeller, 1839; Oncocera faecella; Laodamia griseosparsella Ragonot, 1893; Laodamia griseosparsella var. nigrans Ragonot, 1893; Pyla japonica Inoue, 1959

= Laodamia faecella =

Species of moth

Laodamia faecella is a species of snout moth. It is found from most of Europe (except Ireland, Great Britain, the Benelux, the Iberian Peninsula and most of the Balkan Peninsula) to Japan.

Its wingspan is 24–28 mm.
