= Moula-Guercy =

Paleontological site in France

The Moula-Guercy Cave (French: Baume de Moula-Guercy) is a paleontological site located on a calcareous cliff 80 m (260 ft) above the west bank of the Rhône river in France. It is close to the village of Soyons, 10 km (6.2 mi) south of Valence, Ardèche. It was discovered in 1970 or 1972 by M. Moula. The site is composed of six cavities, the majority of which were occupied in the Middle Paleolithic. Moula-Guercy cave was first excavated between 1975 and 1982 by P. Paven, with later excavations conducted by A. Defleur between 1993 and 1999, following an initial survey undertaken in 1991.

The cave was occupied by Neanderthals approximately 100,000 BP. The excavations carried out at the site in the 1990s found abundant faunal, archaeological and paleobotanical remains, including the bone remains of six individuals of the Homo neanderthalensis species.

Evidence has been found at the site which has been inferred to demonstrate Neanderthal cannibalism. The bones showed cut marks and are very well preserved.

However, the director of the Mandrin Cave research project, Ludovic Slimak, who was one of the 1990s excavation team, has since highlighted the poor evidence for nutritional cannibalism. He has questioned whether the marks indicate cannibalism at all, due to the differences between the marks on the human bones and the animal bones with which they were mixed, and has suggested ritual flesh stripping as an alternative interpretation.
