= Bajondillo Cave =

Cave in Málaga, Spain with early human fossils

Coordinates: 36.621982°N 4.49994°W

Bajondillo Cave (Spanish: Cueva Bajondillo) is an archaeological site located on the south-central coast of the Iberian Peninsula, within the municipality of Torremolinos near Malaga in Spain. It is approximately 127 km east of the Strait of Gibraltar. Archaeologically, the region is sometimes referred to as "southern Iberia".

The cave is believed to have served as a shelter for early modern humans and Neanderthals.

== Archaeological excavations ==
An archaeological excavation of Bajondillo Cave was completed in 2011. The study yielded significant information about the early arrival of modern humans in the region, including insights into their diets and behaviors. Some findings challenge previous assumptions regarding the timing of interaction and replacement between Neanderthals and anatomically modern humans ("AMH") in this area. Specifically, previous misperceptions about the systematic consumption of shellfish by Neanderthals were contradicted. The cave's unique position and elevation provided an exceptional location for early hominid occupation and for the preservation of fossils and other remnants. Although no human remains were found, large quantities of both lithic and non-lithic fragments and artifacts were available for examination. Stratigraphic and dating analyses provided evidence of continuous hominid occupation from at least 150 thousand years Before Present (ka BP).

=== Findings ===
The 2011 excavation produced important data regarding the collection and consumption of shellfish by early hominids in the Iberian region. The elevation of the cave, which was never below or at sea level, indicates that the large quantities of mollusk and mussel remnants found were deposited by humans. Bajondillo Cave is also significant for understanding the connection between Iberian Neanderthals and AMHs, as many coastal Neanderthal sites are now submerged and inaccessible. Moreover, many of the bones, shells, and other finds show evidence of intentional fracturing and/or thermoalteration, consistent with cooking.

The cave was excavated in several phases, and twenty archaeological levels were identified. The first seventeen levels were documented according to stratigraphic sequencing. Approximately 5.7 meters of sediment were excavated. Over 10,000 shellfish and related fragment samples were collected and catalogued with relative certainty to species, genus, or class levels. Thousands of handmade tools were also recovered and labeled. Extensive testing yielded twenty-nine "absolute dates", indicating contiguous early hominid occupation from the Middle Paleolithic Era (MIS 6) to the Neolithic (MIS 1).

Primary site researchers from the University of Seville, Miguel Cortes-Sanchez, et al., defend the structural integrity of the site and excavation, refuting challenges to the technical accuracy of their findings. The researchers assert that "improved radiocarbon protocols have …yielded reliable dates for Bajondillo," while rejecting claims of "displacement erosion" and cross-level contamination within the site, whether naturally occurring or manmade.

== History ==
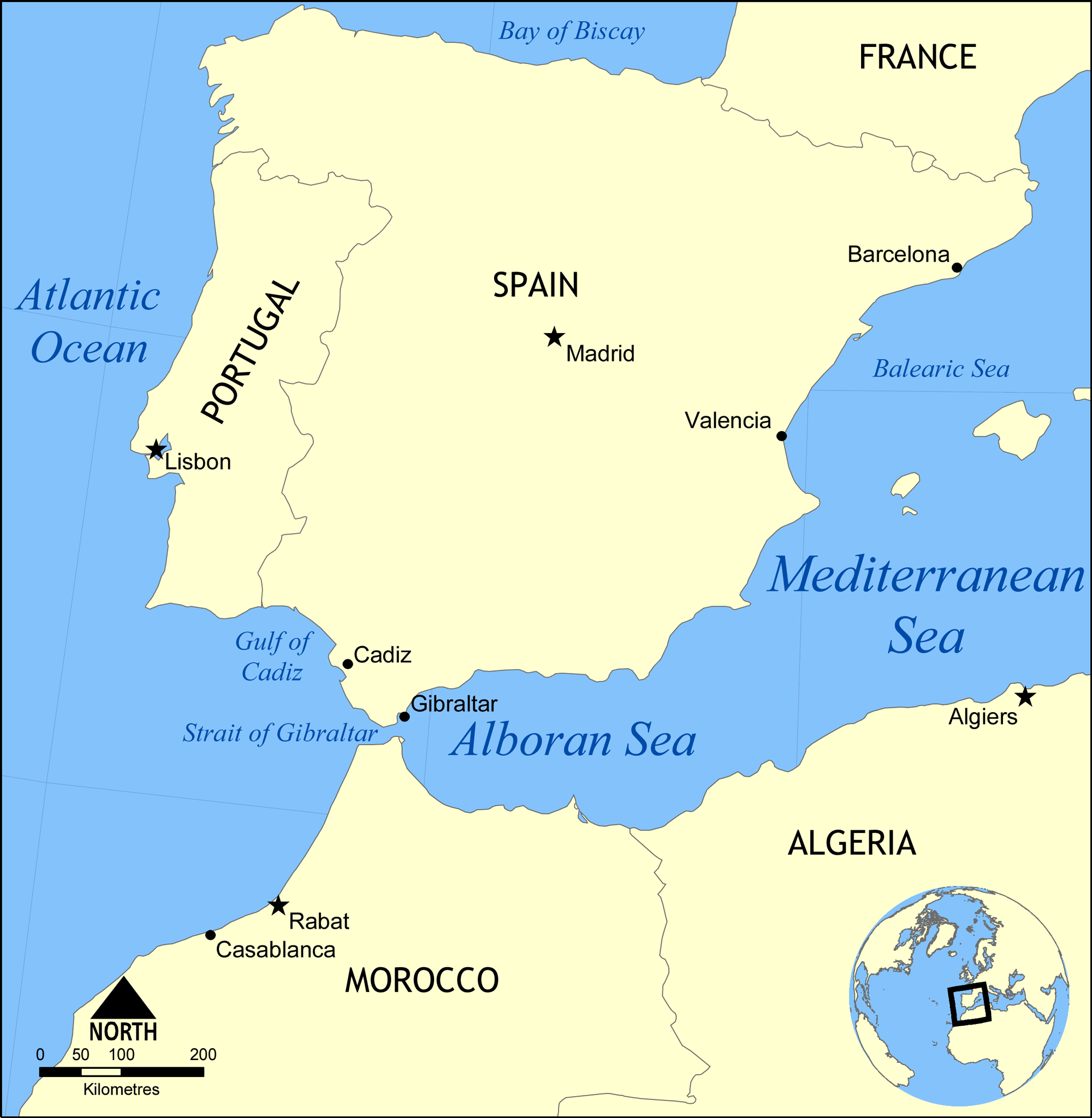
Map of Iberian Peninsula

According to researchers, the stratigraphy within the cave indicates a lengthy chronological-cultural succession encompassing the "Middle Paleolithic, Aurignacian, Gravettian, Solutrean, Magdalenian, Epipaleolithic and Neolithic" eras. Twenty well-defined excavation levels further suggest that this cave was occupied by early hominids almost continuously for nearly 200,000 years.

The cave's unique position relative to the sea made it an ideal protective shelter. Significant fossils, physical remnants, and artifacts indicate epochs of occupation, tool making, use of fire, and the cooking of several mammal species. There is also substantial evidence of shellfish consumption.

The excavation was performed in phases. Beginning in 1989 upon discovery, seventeen levels were excavated to a depth of 5.6m. Later phases exposed an additional 0.006 m of sediment, bringing the number of "bones, shells, and hearths" and other remnants collected to over 10,000 pieces.

== Physical structure ==
The cave is a large rock structure approximately 30 m long, featuring a 30 m high travertine formation. The rock formation is consistent with other limestone dwellings commonly found in that area of the Iberian Peninsula.

Bajondillo Cave is currently 50 m from the coastline and +15 m above mean sea level. Over the epochs of its occupation, the cave's distance from the coast varied from 0. km to 3 km. However, during the most relevant period of occupation from 150 ka BP to approximately 10 ka BP, the cave was conveniently located approximately 00 m from the shore.

== Significance ==
Excavations at the site have resulted in two significant findings: evidence of shellfish collection by Neanderthals, and an indication that the arrival and replacement of Neanderthals by anatomically modern humans occurred 5,000-10,000+ years later than previously believed in this region.

=== Shellfish ===
The first significant finding was the large collection of mussels and other mollusk shells, often exhibiting taphonomic features such as intentional fragmentation and charred markings indicative of cooking, beginning around 155 ka BP. Miguel Cortes-Sanchez and colleagues explained the significance of these findings:

"In view that systematic collection of shellfish has been increasingly recognized as a crucial element of human adaptation to aquatic ecosystems and evidence associated with the appearance of Homo sapiens, the synchronicity of these findings raise the possibility of a behavioral convergence existing in the two hominine lineages triggered by causes yet to be determined."

Although there had been "hints" and reports of evidence of Neanderthal shellfishing in the area, Bajondillo Cave provides the first scientifically documented proof of early, systematic consumption of shellfish by non-modern humans. A principal theory proposed that "the expansion of the diet to incorporate foods of marine origin constitutes a key adaptation … a major shift … in the cognitive capabilities" distinguishing modern humans from Neanderthals. The findings at Bajondillo Cave suggest that Neanderthals were capable of deliberate and systematic shellfish collection, challenging the notion of a clear correlation between shellfish consumption (requiring organization and technical skills) and the arrival of modern humans. Furthermore, this raises the possibility of other unexplored convergences between Neanderthal and Anatomically Modern Humans.

=== Replacement of Neanderthals ===
The second significant finding is that anatomically modern humans appear to have replaced Neanderthals much later in the southern Iberian region than previously thought. Researchers at the University of Seville observed:

"The final replacement of Neanderthals …in western Europe is usually dated to around 39,000 years ago… It is claimed that the southern Iberian region documents the late survival of … Neanderthals to about 32,000 years ago … [However the] Bajondillo Cave … calibrates the replacement to between 45-43,000 years ago, raising questions about the late survival of Neanderthals in southern Iberia. "

Additional findings from Bajondillo Cave suggest that the dispersal of AMHs was faster and more westwardly expansive than previously believed. Earlier research posited that AMHs dispersed quickly primarily into unpopulated or low-population areas, a position challenged by these findings. Furthermore, evidence at Bajondillo reinforces prior research indicating that "coasts and coastal lowlands" were a more temperate and hospitable route for early AMH dispersal and colonization events in many parts of the world. As primary researchers Cortes-Sanchez, et al. state:

"[Data from] Bajondillo make perfect sense … at the time when the last Neanderthal populations were dwindling in Iberia, ecological frontiers were being broken by anatomically modern humans across many parts of the planet."

This evidence prompts further questions, such as whether Neanderthals and modern Homo sapiens coexisted for longer periods than previously understood [,] and whether the Strait of Gibraltar served as a path out of Africa for modern humans [,]. It also confirms the importance of the Mediterranean Coast for the progression of modern humans into Europe. [,]. Studies concerning the Strait of Gibraltar as a transit method for hominids are noted as an especially "promising area of research" that could offer anthropological clarity.
