= Neanderthal behaviour =

Behavior of Neanderthal people

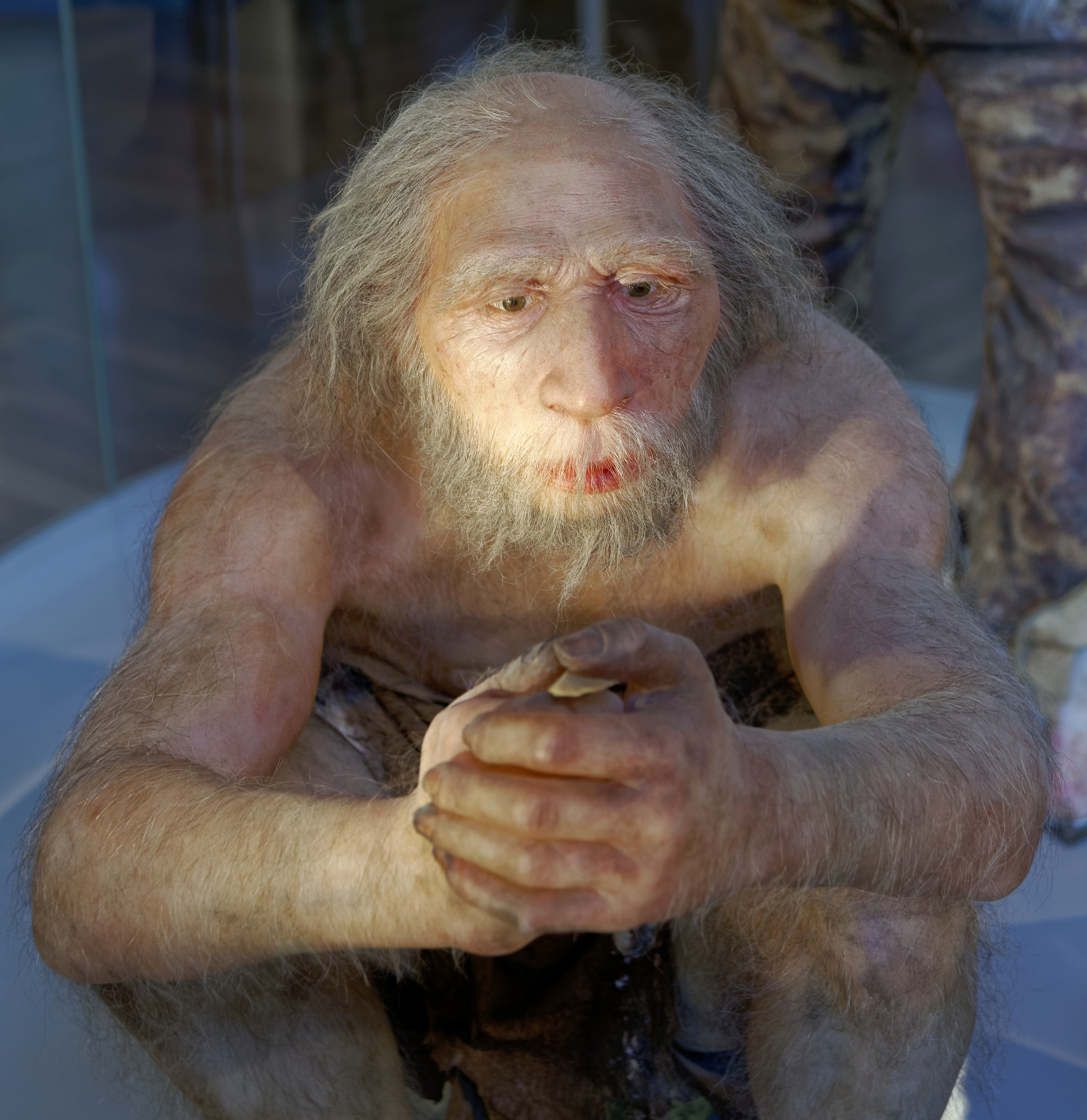
Reconstruction of an elderly Neanderthal holding a stone tool at the Natural History Museum, Vienna

Neanderthal is an extinct species of archaic human of the genus Homo, which inhabited Europe and West-to-Central Asia until roughly 40,000 years ago. Neanderthal behaviour was depicted as primitive, unintelligent, and brutish for much of the early 20th century, and unevolved compared to that of Cro-Magnons, their modern human contemporaries. Although knowledge and perception of Neanderthals have markedly changed in the scientific community since then, the image of the underdeveloped caveman archetype remains prevalent in popular culture. Nonetheless, it is debated if Neanderthals or any pre-modern species exhibited behavioural modernity.

Neanderthal technology achieved a degree of sophistication. It includes the Mousterian stone tool industry as well as the abilities to maintain and possibly to create fire, build cave hearths, craft at least simple clothes similar to blankets and ponchos, make use of medicinal plants, treat severe injuries, store food, and use various cooking techniques such as roasting, boiling, and smoking.

Overall, Neanderthals maintained a low population and population density, and also mainly interacted with only nearby neighbours. Many groups suffered from inbreeding depression. Communities may have seasonally migrated between caves, but most of the raw materials Neanderthals used were collected within only 5 km (3.1 mi) of a site. Indicated by frequent evidence of stunted growth and traumatic injuries, Neanderthals lived harsh lives, which may have contributed to their very slow pace of stone tool innovation.

Neanderthals consumed a wide array of food, mainly what was abundant in their immediate vicinity. This was normally hoofed mammals such as red deer and reindeer, as well as megafauna, plants, small mammals, birds, and aquatic and marine resources. Although they were probably apex predators, they still competed with cave lions, cave hyenas, and other large predators. A number of examples of symbolic thought and Palaeolithic art have been inconclusively attributed to Neanderthals, namely possible ornaments made from bird claws and feathers, collections of unusual objects including crystals and fossils, and engravings. Some claims of religious beliefs have been made. The extent to which Neanderthals could produce speech and use language is debated.

== Popular conceptions ==
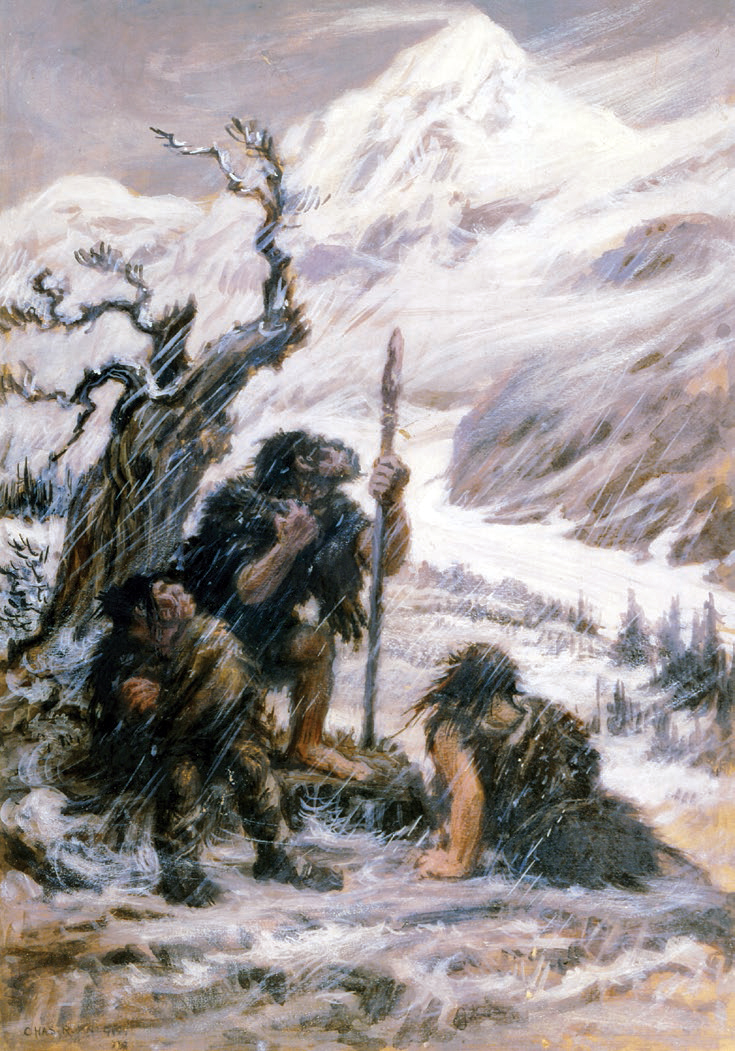
Charles R. Knight's 1911 "Snowbound Neanderthals"

By the early 20th century, several Neanderthal fossils were identified across Europe, establishing H. neanderthalensis as a legitimate species. The most influential specimen was La Chapelle-aux-Saints 1 ("The Old Man") from La Chapelle-aux-Saints, France. French palaeontologist Marcellin Boule authored several publications, among the first to establish palaeontology as a science, detailing the specimen but reconstructing him as slouching, ape-like, and a distant offshoot of modern humans.

Boule fuelled the popular image of Neanderthals as barbarous, slouching, club-wielding primitives in stark contrast to their modern human contemporaries, the Cro-Magnons. The image of the unevolved Neanderthal was reproduced for several decades and popularised in prehistoric fiction works, such as the 1911 The Quest for Fire by J.-H. Rosny aîné and the 1927 The Grisly Folk by H. G. Wells in which they are depicted as monsters. In 1911, Scottish anthropologist Arthur Keith reconstructed La Chapelle-aux-Saints 1 as an immediate precursor to modern humans, sitting next to a fire, producing tools, wearing a necklace, and having a more humanlike posture, but this failed to garner much scientific rapport, and Keith later abandoned his thesis in 1915.

By the middle of the century, the scientific community began to rework its understanding of Neanderthals based on new fossil discoveries and reevaluations of earlier material. Ideas such as Neanderthal intelligence and culture became mainstream, and a more humanlike image of them emerged. In 1939, American anthropologist Carleton Coon reconstructed a Neanderthal in a modern business suit and hat to emphasise that they would be, more or less, indistinguishable from modern humans had they survived into the present. William Golding's 1955 novel The Inheritors depicts Neanderthals as much more emotional and civilised. In modern-day, Neanderthal reconstructions are often very humanlike, but the question of behavioural modernity in Neanderthals or any other pre-modern species is still debated. Traditionally, behavioural modernity has been associated archaeologically with modern human Upper Palaeolithic traditions, and characterised as a major revolution which led to the overwhelming success of modern humans over other species.

In modern popular culture, the "caveman" archetype often mocks Neanderthals as primitive, hunchbacked, knuckle-dragging, club-wielding, grunting, nonsocial characters driven solely by animal instinct. "Neanderthal" can also be used as an insult. In literature, they are sometimes depicted as brutish or monstrous, such as Elizabeth Marshall Thomas' The Animal Wife, but sometimes with a complex but unfamiliar culture, as in Björn Kurtén's Dance of the Tiger, and Jean M. Auel's Clan of the Cave Bear and her Earth's Children series.

== Social structure ==
=== Social organisation ===
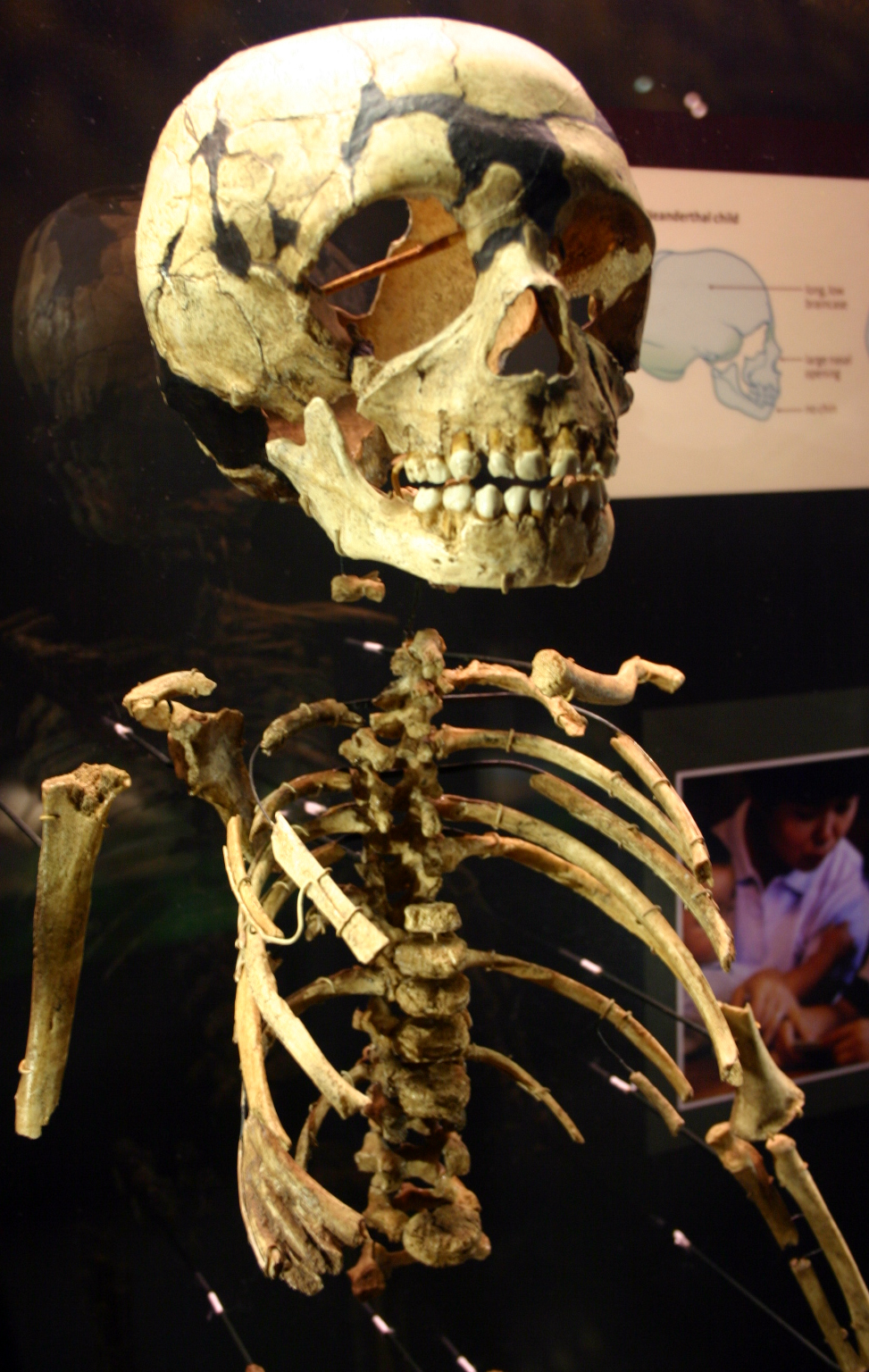
Skeleton of a Neanderthal child discovered in Roc de Marsal near Les Eyzies, France, on display at the Hall of Human Origins, Washington, D.C.

Reliable evidence of Neanderthal group composition comes from:

- Cueva del Sidrón, Spain, showing 7 adults, 3 adolescents, 2 juveniles, and an infant;
- the footprints of Le Rozel, France, showing (based on footprint size) a group of 10 to 13 members where all but one were juveniles or adolescents,
- and Chagyrskaya Cave in the Siberian Altai Mountains showing 6 adults and 5 children (including a father, daughter, and possibly cousins). This family may have died of starvation.

A Neanderthal child's teeth analysed in 2018 showed it was born in the spring and weaned after 2.5 years, similar to modern hunter-gatherers. Indicated from various ailments resulting from high stress at a low age, such as stunted growth, British archaeologist Paul Pettitt hypothesised that children of both sexes were put to work directly after weaning; and American palaeonthropologist Erik Trinkaus suggested that, upon reaching adolescence, an individual may have been expected to join in hunting large and dangerous game. Stunting may have also resulted from harsh winters and bouts of insufficient food resources. Because Neanderthal bone trauma is comparable to that of recent Inuit, the characterisation of a short, violent life may be oversimplified. Cro-Magnons and Neanderthals had a similar trauma rate.

Bands likely moved between certain caves depending on the season, as indicated by remains of seasonal materials such as certain foods, and returned to the same locations generation after generation. Some sites may have been used for over 100 years. Sites showing evidence of no more than three individuals may have represented nuclear families or temporary camping sites for special task groups (such as a hunting party). Cave bears may have competed with Neanderthals for cave space, and there is a decline in cave bear populations starting 50,000 years ago onwards (although their extinction occurred well after Neanderthals had died out). Neanderthals also had a preference for caves whose openings faced towards the south.

Neanderthals are generally considered to have been cave dwellers. Open-air settlements near contemporaneously inhabited cave systems in the Levant could indicate mobility between cave and open-air bases in this area. Evidence for long-term open-air settlements is known from 'Ein Qashish, Israel.

=== Inter-group relations ===
==== Trade ====
Populations may not have been as capable of inter-group interaction and trade as Cro-Magnons, with genetic data suggesting low population density, and archaeological data indicating the sourcing of artefacts from usually no farther than 5 kilometres (3.1 mi) from the main settlement.

Nonetheless, because a few Neanderthal artefacts in a settlement could have originated 20, 30, 100, and 300 kilometres (12.5, 18.5, 60, and 185 mi) away, there does seem to have been at least limited long-distance inter-group relations. British anthropologist Eiluned Pearce and Cypriot archaeologist Theodora Moutsiou speculated that Neanderthals were possibly capable of forming geographically expansive ethnolinguistic tribes encompassing upwards of 800 people, based on the transport of obsidian up to 300 kilometres (190 mi) from the source. Still, they conceded that Neanderthal long-distance networks would have been significantly hindered by a smaller population compared to Cro-Magnons.

==== Breeding ====
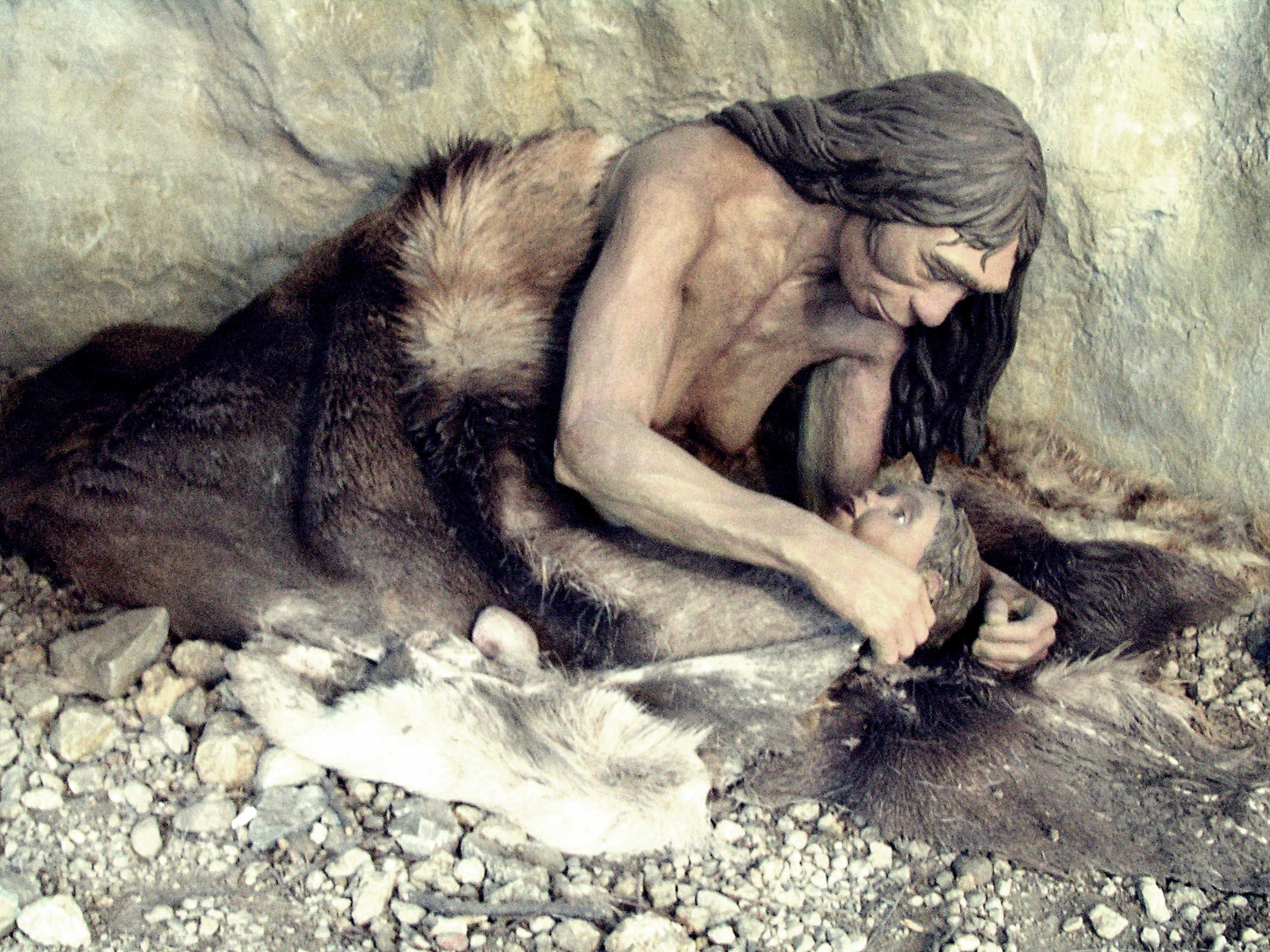
Neanderthal mother with child depicted in the Anthropos Pavilion of the Moravian Museum

A small population size led to low genetic diversity and probably inbreeding, which reduced the population's ability to filter out harmful mutations (inbreeding depression). It is unclear how this affected a single Neanderthal's genetic burden and, thus, if this caused a higher rate of birth defects than in Cro-Magnons. If it did, it could have contributed to the extinction of the species (mutational meltdown).

The DNA of a Neanderthal from Denisova Cave, Russia, shows that she had an inbreeding coefficient of 1/8. (Note: Her parents were either half-siblings with a common mother, double first cousins, an uncle and niece, or aunt and nephew, or a grandfather and granddaughter or grandmother and grandson.) The discovery of such an individual may indicate that inbreeding was common here. The 13 inhabitants of Sidrón Cave collectively exhibited 17 different birth defects likely due to inbreeding or recessive disorders.

When inter-group resettlement did happen, at least some groups may have practised patrilocal residency (a woman moved out of her group to live with her male partner), as suggested by mtDNA of the Neanderthals of Cueva del Sidrón, Spain. Here, the three adult men belonged to the same maternal lineage, while the three adult women belonged to different ones. Chromosomal analysis at Chagyrskaya Cave indicates a similar pattern of female migration.

==== Population dynamics ====
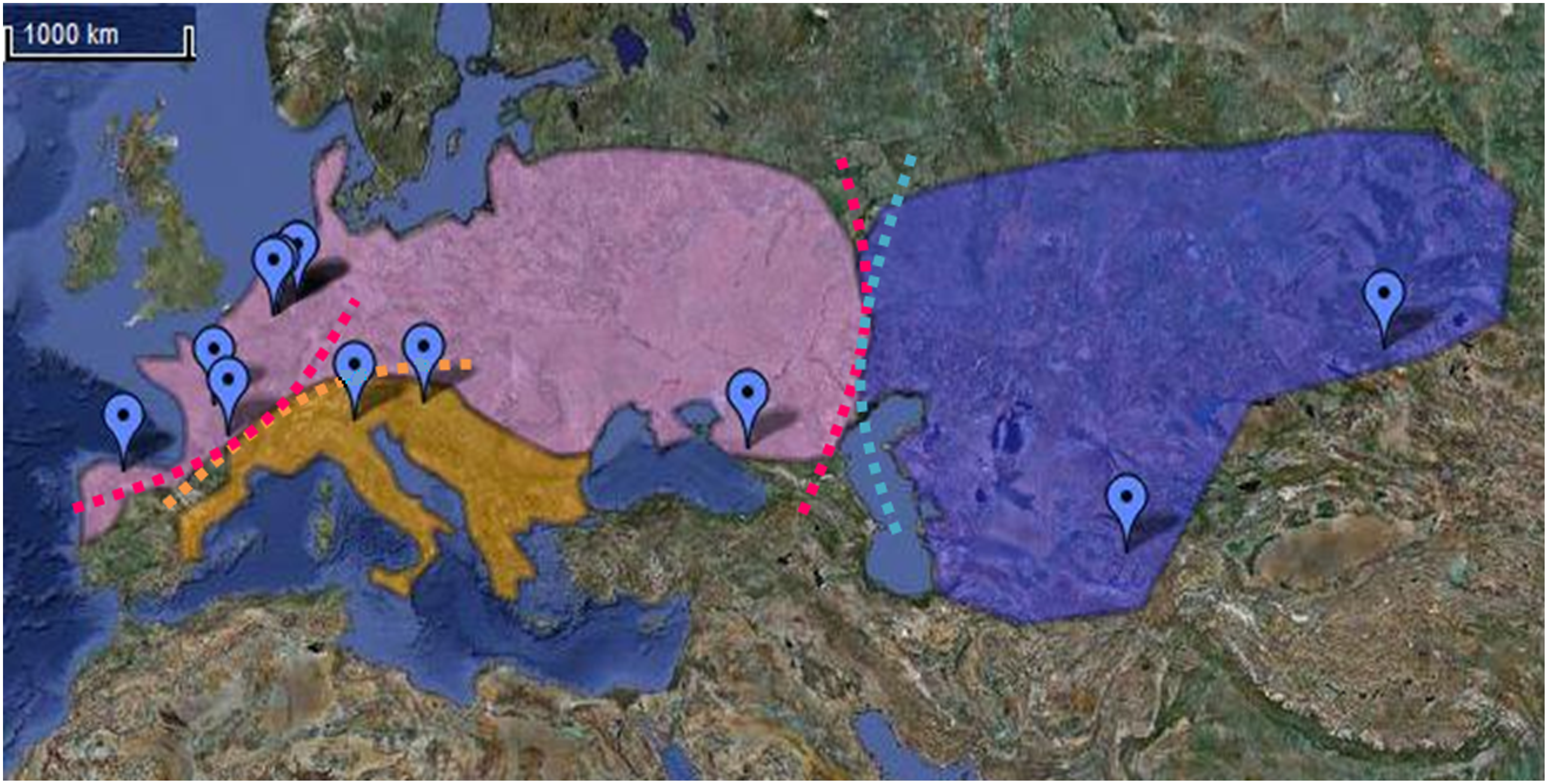
Genetically, Neanderthals can be grouped into three distinct regions (above). Dots indicate sampled specimens.

Genetic analysis indicates there were at least three distinct geographical groups:

- Western Europe,
- the Mediterranean coast,
- and east of the Caucasus, with some migration among these regions.

Post-Eemian Western European Mousterian stone tools can also be broadly grouped into three distinct macro-regions:

- Acheulean-tradition Mousterian in the southwest,
- Micoquian in the northeast,
- and Mousterian with bifacial tools (MBT) in between the former two. MBT may actually represent the interactions and fusion of the two different cultures.

Southern Neanderthals exhibit regional anatomical differences from northern counterparts, namely:

- a less protrusive jaw,
- a shorter gap behind the molars,
- and a vertically higher jawbone.

These all suggest Neanderthal communities regularly interacted with closely neighbouring communities within a region, but not as often beyond.

Over long periods, there is evidence of large-scale cross-continental migration. Early specimens from Mezmaiskaya Cave in the Caucasus and Denisova Cave in the Siberian Altai Mountains differ genetically from Western European Neanderthals, whereas later specimens from these caves both have genetic profiles more similar to Western European Neanderthals than to the earlier specimens from the same locations. These suggest large-scale population replacement over time. Similarly, artefacts and DNA from Chagyrskaya and Okladnikov Caves, also in the Altai Mountains, resemble those of eastern European Neanderthal sites about 3,000–4,000 km (1,900–2,500 mi) away more than they do artefacts and DNA of the older Neanderthals from Denisova Cave, suggesting two distinct migration events into Siberia.

Neanderthals seem to have suffered a major population decline during MIS 4 (71–57,000 years ago), and the distribution of the Micoquian tradition could indicate that Central Europe and the Caucasus were repopulated by communities from a refuge zone either in eastern France or Hungary (the fringes of the Micoquian tradition) who dispersed along the rivers Prut and Dniester.

==== Conflict ====
There is some evidence of conflict: a skeleton from La Roche à Pierrot, France, showing a healed fracture on top of the skull apparently caused by a deep blade wound, and another from Shanidar Cave, Iraq, with a rib lesion characteristic of projectile weapon injuries.

=== Social hierarchy ===
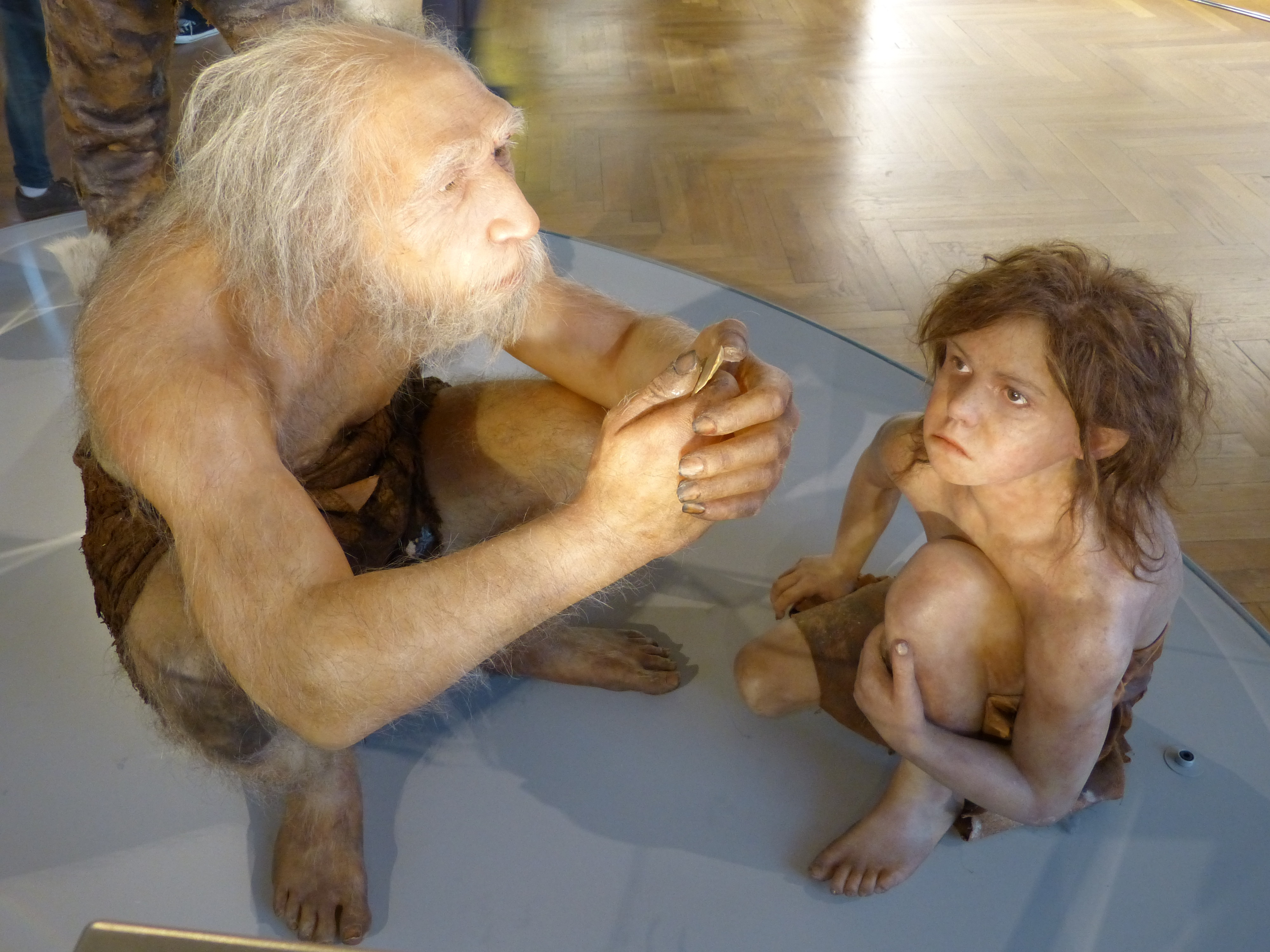
Reconstruction of an elderly Neanderthal man and child in the Natural History Museum, Vienna

It is sometimes suggested that, because Neanderthals were hunters of challenging big game and lived in small groups, there was no sexual division of labour as seen in modern hunter-gatherer societies. That is, men, women, and children all had to be involved in hunting, instead of men hunting and women and children foraging. On the other hand, with modern hunter-gatherers, typically the higher the meat dependency, the more stringent the division of labour. Further, tooth-wearing patterns in Neanderthal men and women suggest they commonly used their teeth for carrying items, but men exhibit more wearing on the upper teeth, and women the lower, suggesting some cultural differences in tasks.

It is controversially proposed that some Neanderthals wore decorative clothing or jewellery—such as a leopard skin or raptor feathers—to display elevated status in the group. Trinkaus suggested that elderly Neanderthals were given special burial rites for lasting so long, given the high mortality rates. Alternatively, many more Neanderthals may have received burials, but the graves were infiltrated and destroyed by, for example, bears. Given that 20 graves of Neanderthals aged under 4 have been found—over a third of all known graves—deceased children may have received greater care during burial than other age demographics.

Looking at Neanderthal skeletons from several natural rock shelters, Trinkaus found that although Neanderthals were recorded as bearing several trauma-related injuries, none had significant leg trauma that would debilitate movement. He suggested that self worth in Neanderthal culture derived from contributing food to the group; a debilitating injury would remove this self-worth and result in near-immediate death, and individuals who could not keep up with the group while moving from cave to cave were left behind. There are, nonetheless, examples of individuals with other debilitating injuries being nursed for several years. There are examples of infirming injured group members in even earlier human species. Especially given the high trauma rates, it is possible that such an altruistic strategy ensured the survival of the species for so long.

== Food ==
=== Hunting and gathering ===
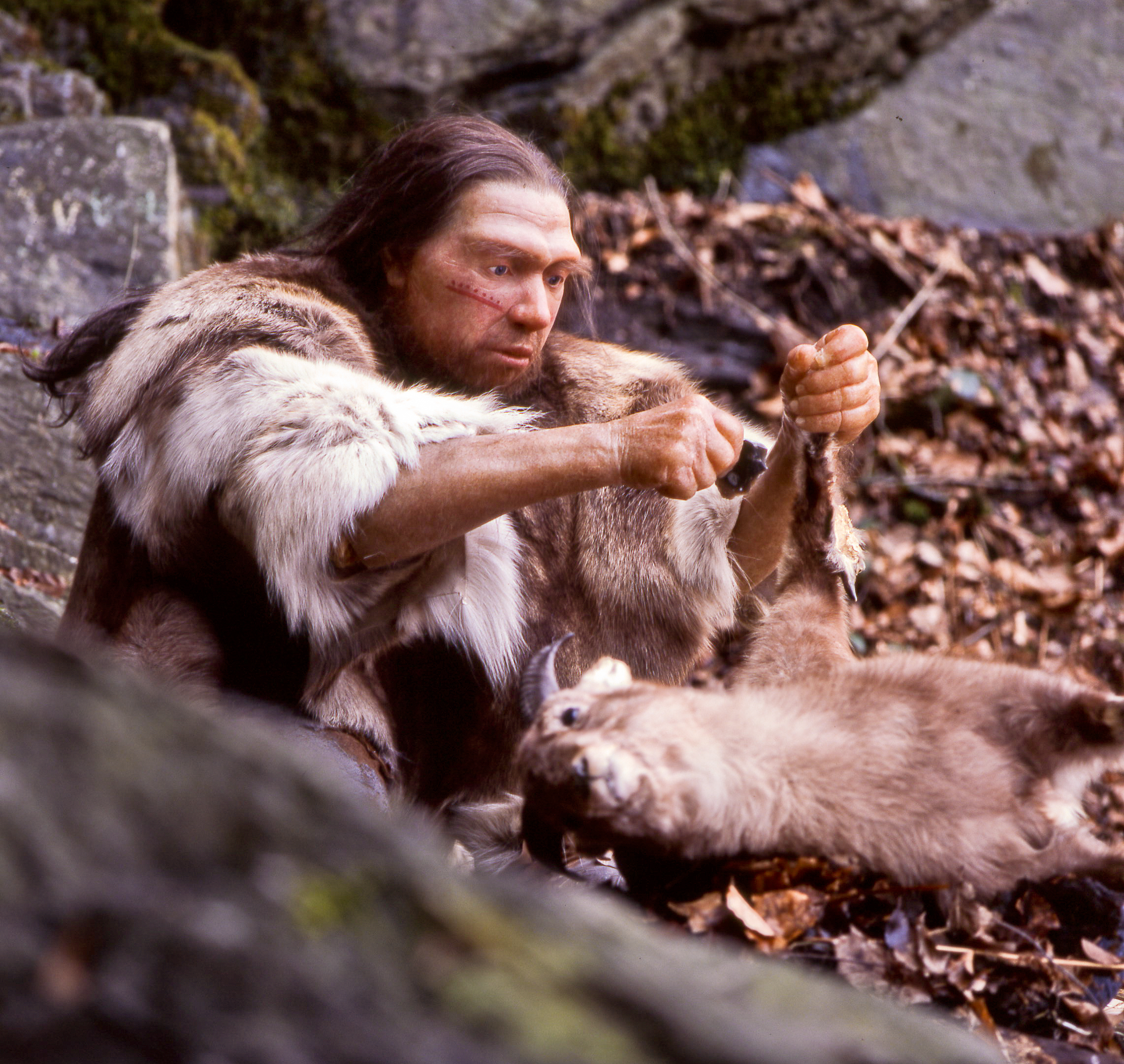
Reconstruction of a Neanderthal man butchering a goat at the Neanderthal Museum

Neanderthals were once thought of as scavengers, but are now considered to have been apex predators. Inhabiting usually a forested landscape, Neanderthals were likely ambush hunters, getting close to and attacking their target—a prime adult—in a short burst of speed, thrusting in a spear at close quarters. Younger or wounded animals may have been hunted using traps, projectiles, or pursuit.

Some sites show evidence that Neanderthals slaughtered whole herds of animals in large, indiscriminate hunts and then carefully selected which carcasses to process. In 1980, it was hypothesised that two piles of mammoth skulls at La Cotte de St Brelade, Jersey, at the base of a gulley were evidence of mammoth drive hunting (causing them to stampede off a ledge), but this is contested.

They appear to have eaten predominantly what was abundant within their immediate surroundings, with steppe-dwelling communities (generally outside of the Mediterranean) subsisting almost entirely on meat from large game, forest-dwelling communities consuming a wide array of plants and smaller animals, and waterside communities gathering aquatic resources. Nonetheless, even in more southerly, temperate areas such as the southeastern Iberian Peninsula, large game still featured prominently in Neanderthal diets. Cro-Magnons, in contrast, seem to have used more complex food extraction strategies and generally had a more diverse diet.

Nonetheless, Neanderthals still would have had to have eaten a varied enough diet to prevent nutrient deficiencies and protein poisoning, especially in the winter when they presumably ate mostly lean meat. Any food with high contents of other essential nutrients not provided by lean meat would have been vital components of their diet, such as fat-rich brains, carbohydrate-rich and abundant underground storage organs (including roots and tubers), or, like modern Inuit, the stomach contents of herbivorous prey items.

=== Food items ===
==== Prey items ====
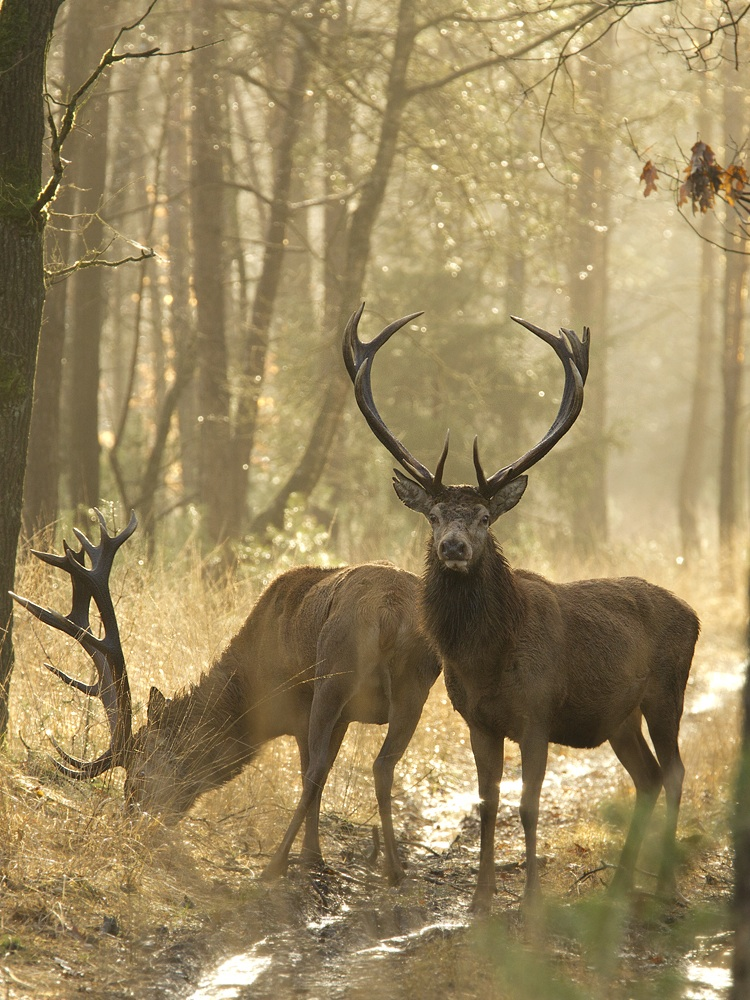
Neanderthals hunted whatever was abundant, usually red deer

The primary source of meat for Neanderthals consisted of hoofed mammals. Neanderthals hunted whatever was abundant, mainly red deer and reindeer, but they also consumed other Pleistocene megafauna. (Note: Neanderthals devoured Pleistocene megafauna such as: chamois; ibex; wild boar; steppe wisent; aurochs; Irish elk; Woolly mammoth; straight-tusked elephant; woolly rhinoceros; Merck's rhinoceros; narrow-nosed rhinoceros; wild horses.; There is also evidence of a butchering cave and brown bears.) Examination of Neanderthal bones, i.e., collagen from Vindija Cave, Croatia, reinforces this conclusion by demonstrating their almost exclusive reliance on meat as a protein source.

Neanderthals also hunted small game. Some caves show evidence of the regular consumption of rabbits and tortoises. At Gibraltar sites, there are remains of 143 different bird species, many ground-dwelling, such as the common quail, corn crake, woodlark, and crested lark. Scavenging birds such as corvids and eagles were commonly exploited.

Neanderthals exploited marine resources on the Iberian, Italian and Peloponnesian Peninsulas, where they waded or dove for shellfish, as early as 150,000 years ago at Cueva Bajondillo, Spain, similar to the fishing record of modern humans. At Vanguard Cave, Gibraltar, the inhabitants consumed Mediterranean monk seal, short-beaked common dolphin, common bottlenose dolphin, Atlantic bluefin tuna, sea bream, and purple sea urchin. At Gruta da Figueira Brava, Portugal, there is evidence of large-scale harvest of shellfish, crabs, and fish. Evidence of freshwater fishing was found in Grotte di Castelcivita, Italy, for trout, chub, and eel; Abri du Maras, France, for chub and European perch; Payré, France; and Kudaro Cave, Russia, for Black Sea salmon.

==== Plant items ====
The archaeological record shows that Neanderthals consumed a variety of plants and mushrooms across their range. Bone traumas in the leg joints could possibly suggest habitual squatting, which, if the case, was likely done while gathering foodplants.

Based on dental tartar, Neanderthals from Cueva del Sidrón, Spain, consumed mushrooms, pine nuts, and moss, indicating they were forest foragers. Dental tartar from Grotte de Spy, Belgium, indicates the inhabitants had a meat-heavy diet including woolly rhinoceros and mouflon sheep, while also regularly consuming mushrooms. Neanderthal faecal matter from El Salt, Spain, dated to 50,000 years ago—the oldest human faecal matter remains recorded—show a diet mainly of meat but with a significant component of plants.

Evidence of cooked plant foods—mainly legumes and, to a far lesser extent, acorns—was discovered at Kebara Cave, Israel, with its inhabitants possibly gathering plants in spring and fall and hunting in all seasons except fall (the cave was probably abandoned in late summer to early fall). Remnants from Amud Cave, Israel, indicates a diet of figs, palm tree fruits and various cereals and edible grasses.

At Shanidar Cave, Iraq, Neanderthals collected plants across various harvest seasons, indicating they scheduled returns to the area to harvest specific plants, and had complex food-gathering behaviours for both meat and plants.

=== Food preparation ===
Neanderthals probably could employ a wide range of cooking techniques, such as roasting, and they may have been able to heat up or boil soup, stew, or animal stock. The abundance of animal bone fragments at settlements may indicate the making of fat stocks from boiling bone marrow, possibly taken from animals that had already died of starvation. These methods would have substantially increased fat consumption, a major nutritional requirement for communities following low-carbohydrate, high-protein diets. Neanderthal tooth size had a decreasing trend after 100,000 years ago, which could indicate an increased dependence on cooking or the advent of boiling, a technique that would have softened food.

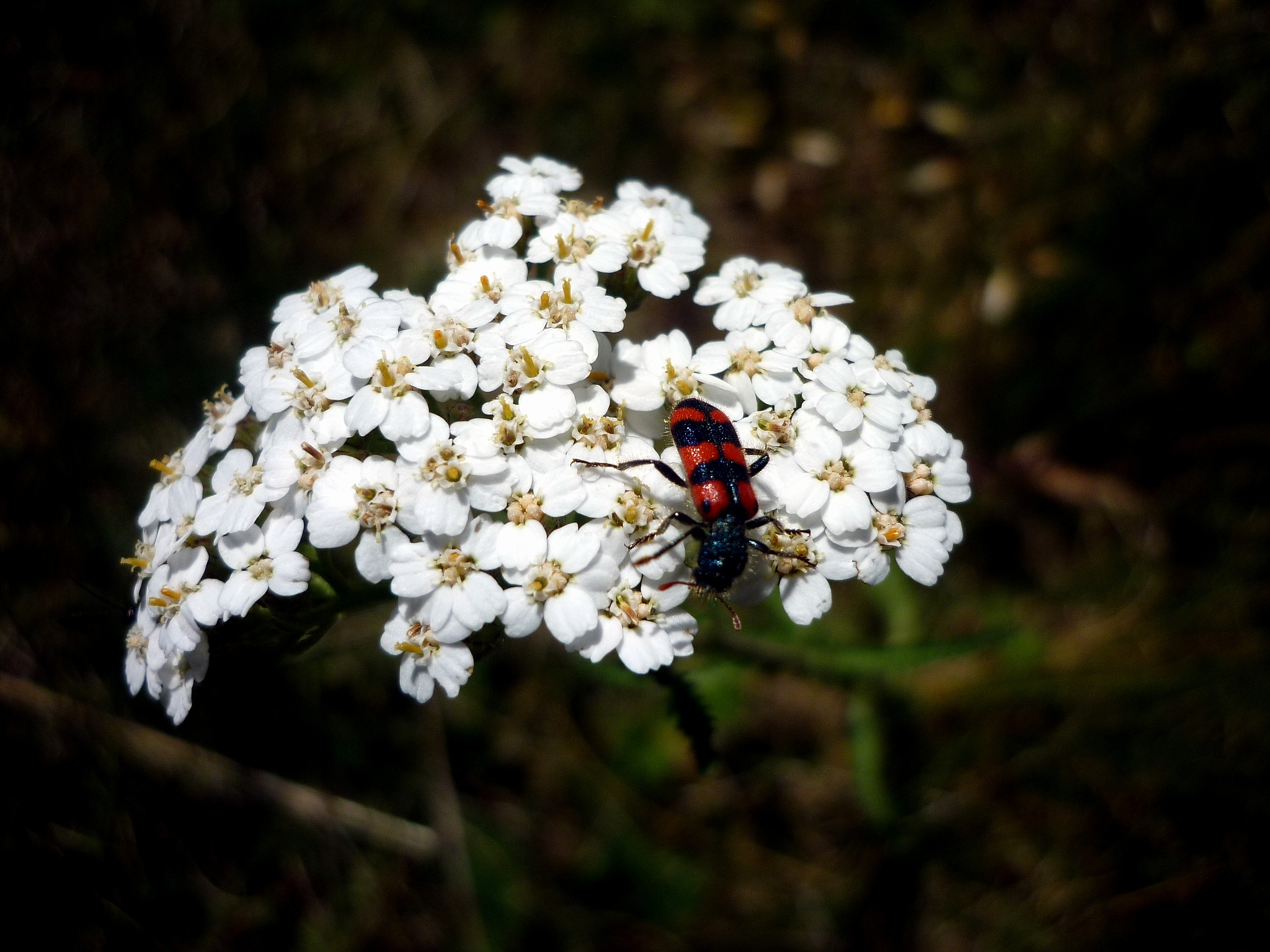
Yarrow growing in Spain

At Cueva del Sidrón, Spain, Neanderthals likely cooked and possibly smoked food, as well as used certain plants—such as yarrow and camomile—as flavouring, although these plants may have instead been used for their medicinal properties. At Gorham's Cave, Gibraltar, Neanderthals may have been roasting pinecones to access pine nuts.

The large quantities of meat and fat that could have been gathered from typical prey items (namely, mammoths) could also indicate the ability to store food. At Grotte du Lazaret, France, a total of twenty-three red deer, six ibexes, three aurochs, and one roe deer appear to have been hunted in a single autumn hunting season, when strong male and female deer herds would group together for rut. The entire carcasses seem to have been transported to the cave and then butchered. Because this is such a large amount of food to consume before spoilage, it is possible these Neanderthals were curing and preserving it before winter set in. At 160,000 years old, it is the oldest potential evidence of food storage.

With shellfish, Neanderthals needed to eat, cook, or somehow preserve them soon after collection, as shellfish spoil very quickly. At Cueva de los Aviones, Spain, the remains of edible, algae eating shellfish associated with the alga Jania rubens could indicate that, like some modern hunter-gatherer societies, harvested shellfish were held in water-soaked algae to keep them alive and fresh until consumption. At Gruta da Figueira Brava, Neanderthals may have been roasting brown crabs to soften the shell before cracking them open with a hammerstone.

=== Competition ===
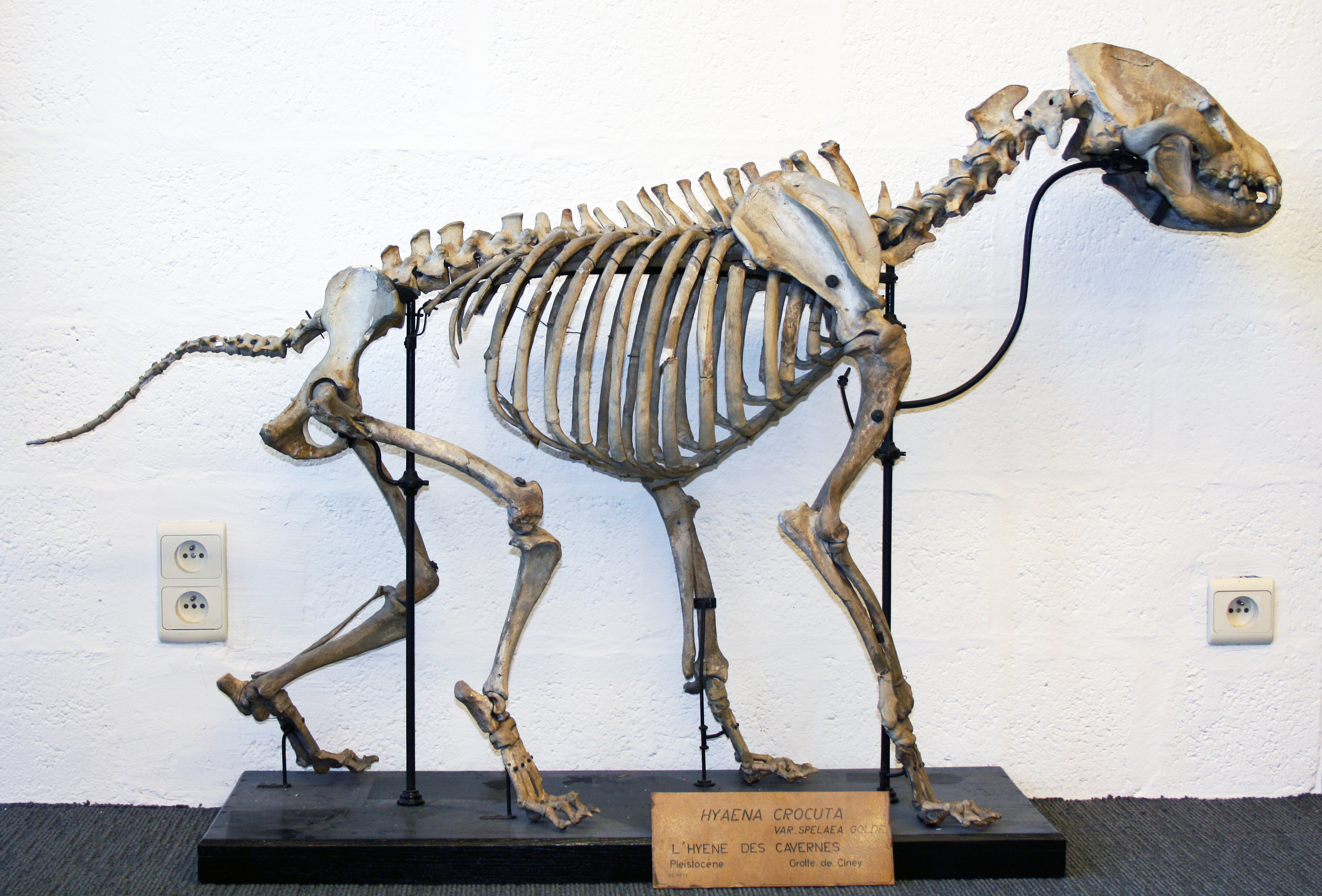
Cave hyena skeleton

Competition from large Ice Age predators was rather high. Cave lions likely targeted horses, large deer, and wild cattle; and European leopards reindeer and roe deer primarily, which overlapped with the Neanderthal diet. To defend a kill against such ferocious predators, Neanderthals may have engaged in a group display of yelling, arm waving, or stone throwing, or quickly gathered meat and abandoned the kill. At Grotte de Spy, Belgium, the remains of wolves, cave lions, and cave bears indicate Neanderthals hunted their competitors to some extent.

Neanderthals and cave hyenas may have exemplified niche differentiation, and actively avoided competing with each other. Although they both primarily targeted the same groups of creatures—deer, horses, and cattle—Neanderthals mainly hunted deer, while cave hyenas hunted the latter two. Animal remains from Neanderthal caves similarly indicate they preferred to hunt prime individuals, whereas cave hyenas hunted weaker or younger prey. Nonetheless, there is evidence that cave hyenas stole food and leftovers from Neanderthal campsites and scavenged on dead Neanderthal bodies. At Payre, France, the Neanderthals may have partitioned resources with wolves.

Neanderthals also suffered extensively at the hands of their competitors. A 2016 study looking at 124 Neanderthal specimens argued that high trauma rates were instead caused by animal attacks, and found that about 36% of the sample were victims of bear attacks, 21% big cat attacks, and 17% wolf attacks (totalling 92 positive cases, 74%). There were no cases of hyena attacks, although hyenas still probably attacked Neanderthals, at least opportunistically.

=== Cannibalism ===
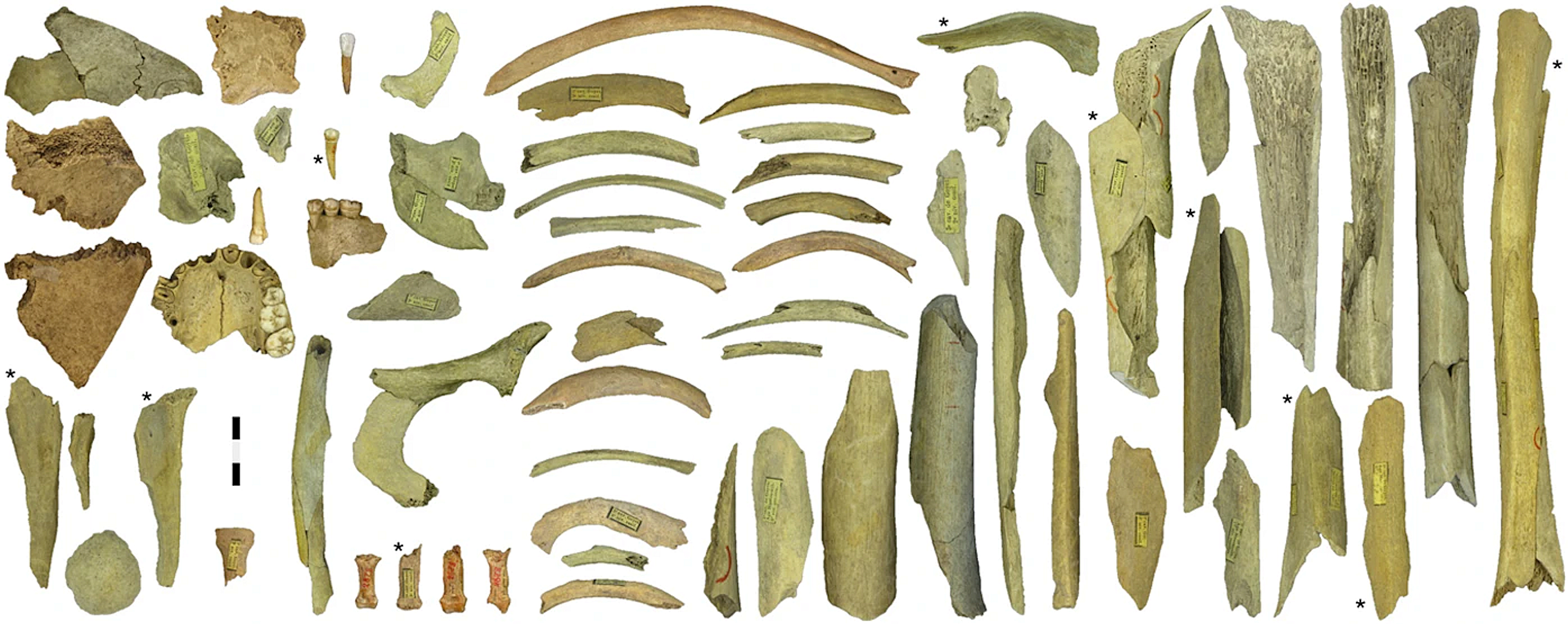
Butchered Neandertal remains from Goyet Caves (Belgium) (Note: Our results show that the Neandertals from the Troisième caverne of Goyet were butchered, with the hypothesis of their exploitation as food sources the most parsimonious explanation for the observed bone surface modifications. Goyet provides the first unambiguous evidence of Neandertal cannibalism in Northern Europe, and given the dates obtained on the Neandertal remains, it is most likely that they were processed by their fellow Neandertals, as no modern humans are known to have been in the region at the time. However, the available data make it impossible to determine whether the modifications observed on the Neandertal skeletal material represent symbolic practices or simply result from the processing of immediately available sources of food.")

There are several instances of Neanderthals practising cannibalism across their range. The first example came from Krapina, Croatia, in 1899, and other examples were found at the Spanish Cueva del Sidrón and Zafarraya; and the French sites of Moula-Guercy, Les Pradelles, and La Quina. For the five cannibalised Neanderthals at the Grottes de Goyet, Belgium, there is evidence that the upper limbs were disarticulated, the lower limbs defleshed and also smashed (likely to extract bone marrow), the chest cavity disembowelled, and the jaw dismembered. There is also evidence that the butchers used some bones to retouch their tools. The processing of Neanderthal meat at Grottes de Goyet is similar to how they processed horse and reindeer. About 35% of the Neanderthals at Marillac-le-Franc, France, show clear signs of butchery, and the presence of digested teeth indicates that the bodies were abandoned and eaten by scavengers, likely hyenas.

These cannibalistic tendencies have historically been explained as ritual defleshing, pre-burial defleshing (to prevent scavengers or foul smell), acts of war, or simply food preparation. Because of a small number of cases and the higher number of cut marks seen on cannibalised individuals than animals (indicating inexperience), cannibalism was probably not a very common practice. It may have only been done in times of extreme food shortages, as in some cases in recorded human history.

== The arts ==
=== Personal adornment ===
Neanderthals used ochre, a clay earth pigment. Ochre is well documented from 45,000 to 60,000 years ago in Neanderthal sites, with the earliest example dating to 200,000 to 250,000 years ago from Maastricht-Belvédère, the Netherlands (a similar timespan to the ochre record of H. sapiens). It has been hypothesised to have functioned as body paint, and analyses of pigments from Pech de l'Azé, France, indicates they were applied to soft materials (such as a hide or human skin). Red ochre can also have several utilities outside of decoration, such as medicine, tanning hides, food preservative, and insect repellent. Containers apparently used for mixing ochre pigments were found in Peștera Cioarei, Romania, which could indicate modification of ochre for solely aesthetic purposes.

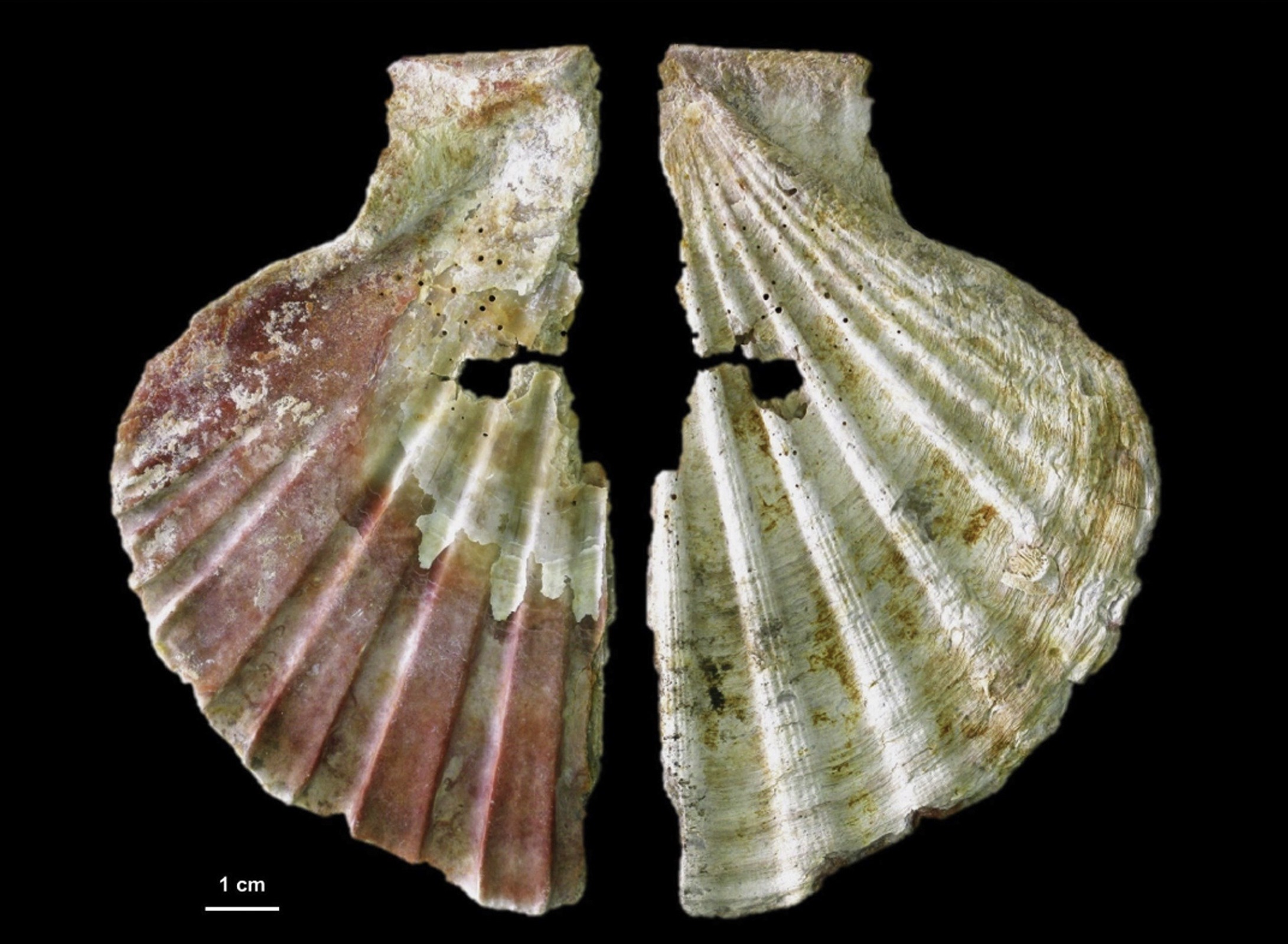
Decorated king scallop shell from Cueva Antón, Spain. Interior (left) with natural red colouration, and exterior (right) with traces of unnatural orange pigmentation

Neanderthals collected uniquely shaped objects and are suggested to have modified them into pendants. Such objects include:

- a fossil Aspa marginata sea snail shell possibly painted red from Grotta di Fumane, Italy, transported over 100 km (62 mi) to the site about 47,500 years ago;
- three shells from Cueva de los Aviones, Spain, dated to about 120–115,000 years ago, perforated through the umbo belonging to:
  - a rough cockle associated with red and yellow pigments,
  - a Glycymeris insubrica also associated with red and yellow pigments,
  - and a Spondylus gaederopus associated with red-to-black mix of hematite and pyrite;
- and a king scallop shell with traces of an orange mix of goethite and hematite from Cueva Antón, Spain.

The discoverers of the latter two claim that pigment was applied to the exterior to make it match the naturally vibrant inside colouration. Excavated from 1949 to 1963 from the French Grotte du Renne, Châtelperronian beads made from animal teeth, shells and ivory were found associated with Neanderthal bones. The dating is uncertain, and Châtelperronian artefacts may actually have been crafted by modern humans and simply redeposited with Neanderthal remains.

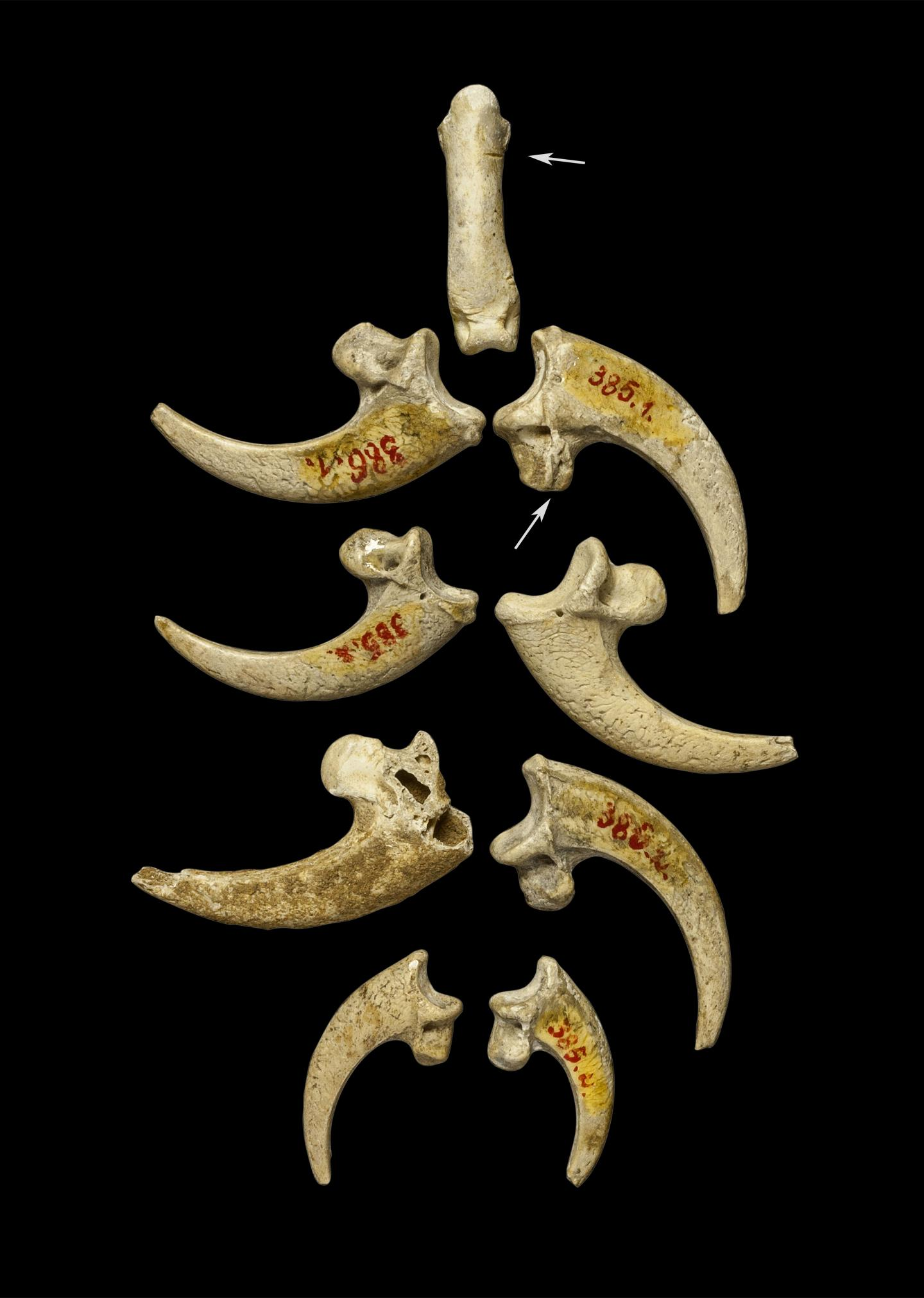
Speculative reconstruction of white-tailed eagle talon jewellery from Krapina, Croatia (arrows indicate cut marks)

Gibraltarian palaeoanthropologists Clive and Geraldine Finlayson suggested that Neanderthals used various bird parts as artistic media, specifically black feathers. In 2012, the Finlaysons and colleagues examined 1,699 sites across Eurasia, and argued that raptors and corvids, species not typically consumed by any human species, were overrepresented and show processing of only the wing bones instead of the fleshier torso, and thus are evidence of feather plucking of specifically the large flight feathers for use as personal adornment. They specifically noted the cinereous vulture, red-billed chough, kestrel, lesser kestrel, alpine chough, rook, jackdaw and the white tailed eagle in Middle Palaeolithic sites. Other birds claimed to present evidence of modifications by Neanderthals are the golden eagle, rock pigeon, common raven and the bearded vulture. The earliest claim of bird bone jewellery is a number of 130,000-year-old white-tailed eagle talons found in a cache near Krapina, Croatia, speculated, in 2015, to have been a necklace. A similar 39,000-year-old Spanish imperial eagle talon necklace was reported in 2019 at Cova Foradà in Spain, though from the contentious Châtelperronian layer. In 2017, 17 incision-decorated raven bones from the Zaskalnaya VI rock shelter, Ukraine, dated to 43–38,000 years ago, were reported. Because the notches are more or less equidistant from each other, they are the first modified bird bones that cannot be explained by simple butchery, and for which the argument of design intent is based on direct evidence.

Discovered in 1975, the so-called Mask of la Roche-Cotard, a mostly flat piece of flint with a bone pushed through a hole on the midsection—dated to 32, 40, or 75,000 years ago—has been purported to resemble the upper half of a face, with the bone representing eyes. It is contested whether it represents a face, or if it even counts as art. In 1988, American archaeologist Alexander Marshack speculated that a Neanderthal at Grotte de L'Hortus, France, wore a leopard pelt as personal adornment to indicate elevated status in the group based on a recovered leopard skull, phalanges and tail vertebrae.

=== Abstraction ===
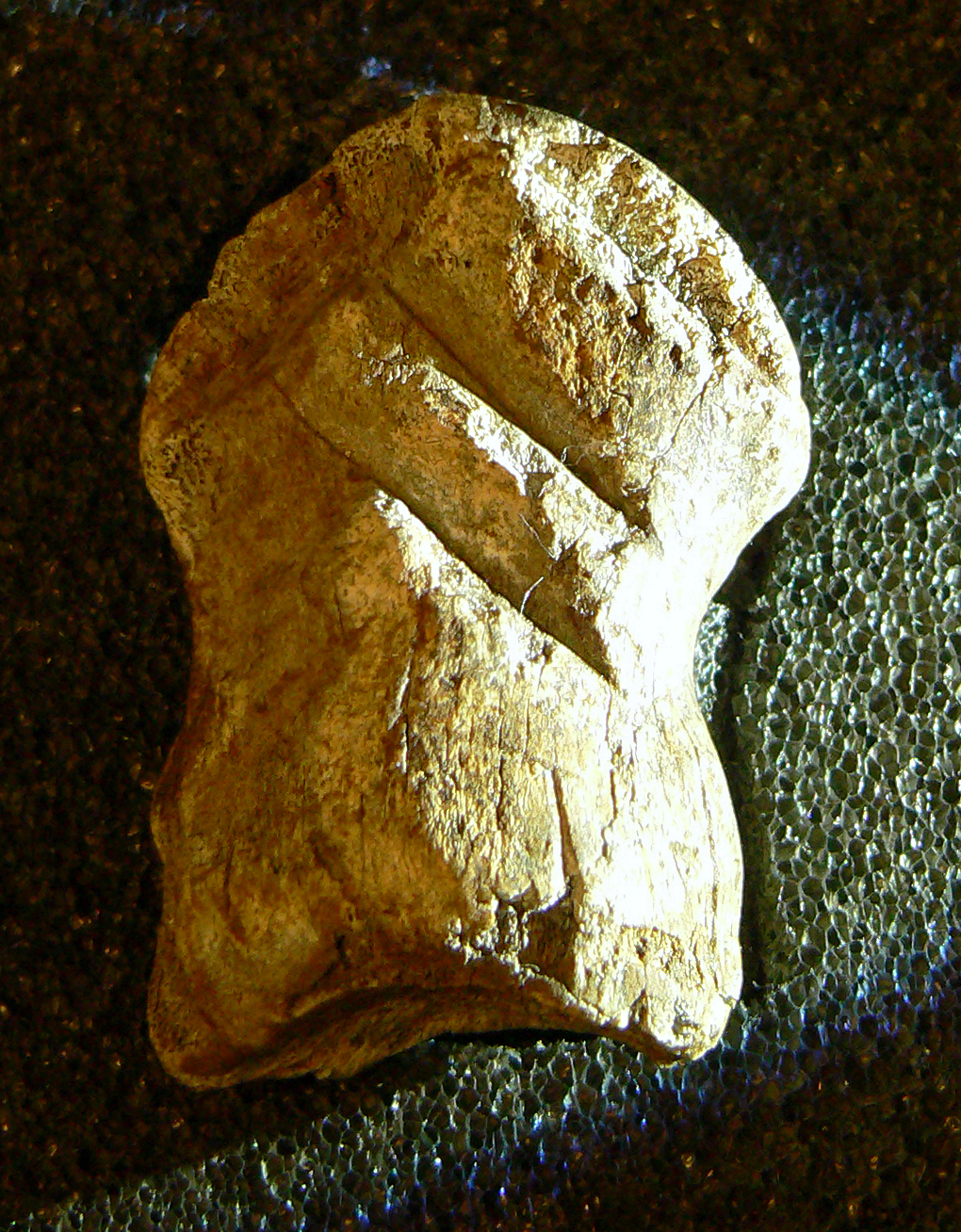
Giant deer bone of Einhornhöhle, Germany, c. 49,000 BC

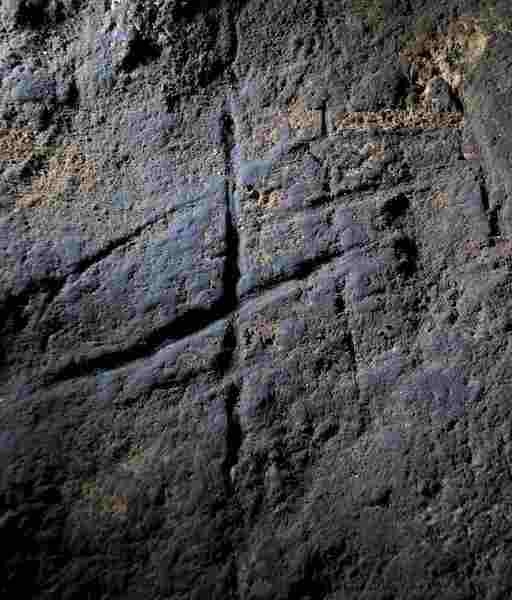
The scratched floor of Gorham's Cave, Gibraltar, c. 39,000 BC

As of 2014, 63 purported engravings have been reported from 27 different European and Middle Eastern Lower-to-Middle Palaeolithic sites, of which 20 are on flint cortexes from 11 sites, 7 are on slabs from 7 sites, and 36 are on pebbles from 13 sites. It is debated whether or not these were made with symbolic intent. In 2012, deep scratches on the floor of Gorham's Cave, Gibraltar, were discovered, dated to older than 39,000 years ago, which the discoverers have interpreted as Neanderthal abstract art. The scratches could have also been produced by a bear. In 2021, an Irish elk phalanx with five engraved offset chevrons stacked above each other was discovered at the entrance to the Einhornhöhle cave in Germany, dating to about 51,000 years ago. A flint flake at the Kiik-Koba site in Crimea, Ukraine, is decorated with an engraving which would have required skilled workmanship.

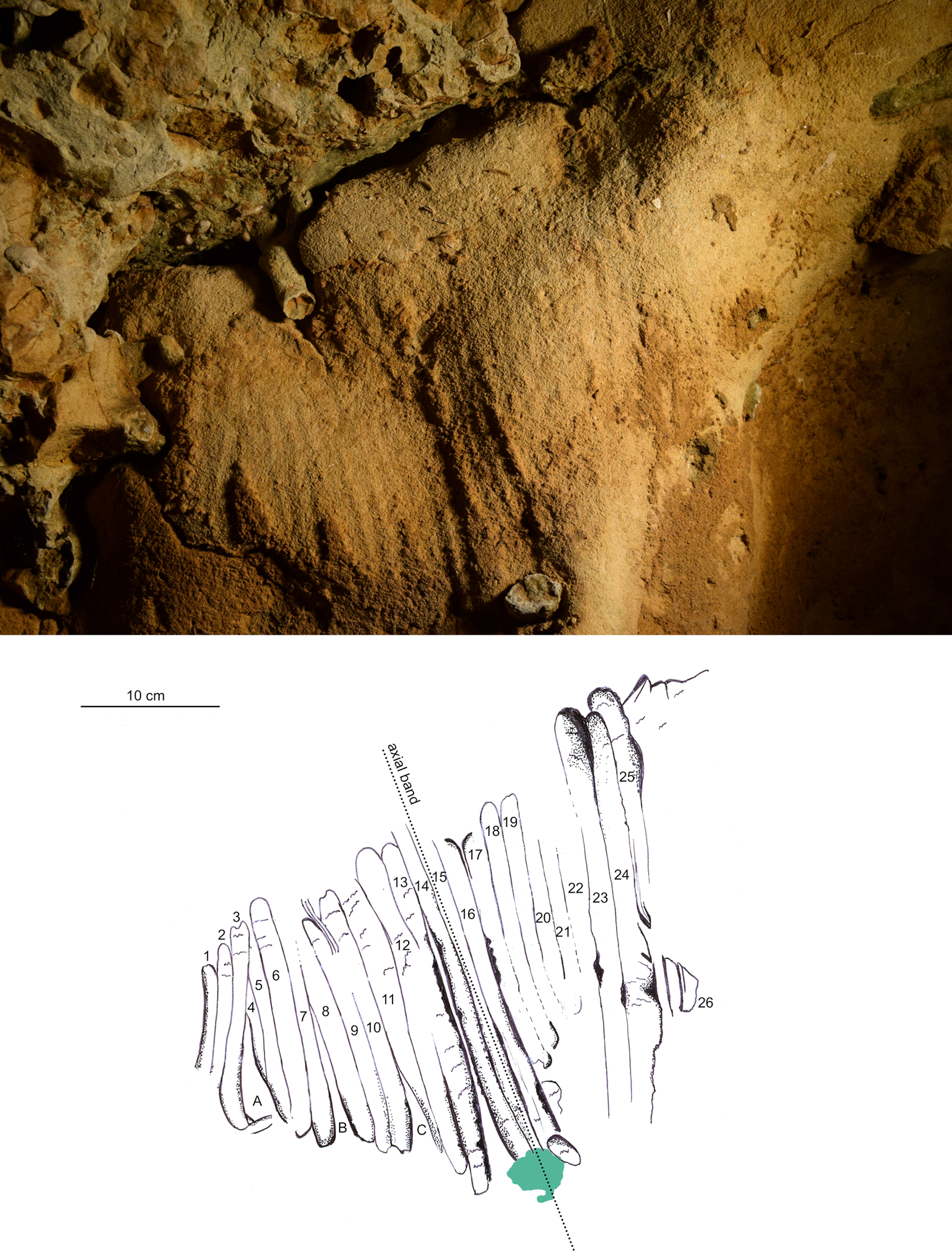
Neanderthal finger flutings at La Roche-Cotard

In 2018, some red-painted dots, disks, lines, and hand stencils on the cave walls of the Spanish La Pasiega, Maltravieso, and Doña Trinidad were dated to be older than 66,000 years, predating the arrival of modern humans in Western Europe. If the dating is correct, this would indicate Neanderthal authorship, and similar iconography recorded in other Western European sites—such as Les Merveilles, France, and Cueva del Castillo, Spain—could potentially also have Neanderthal origins. The dating of these Spanish caves, and thus attribution to Neanderthals, is contested. Neanderthals may have produced finger flutings on the walls of La Roche-Cotard over 57,000 years ago.

Neanderthals are known to have collected a variety of unusual objects—such as crystals or fossils—without any clear functional purpose or evidence of use-related damage. It is unclear whether these objects were simply picked up for their aesthetic qualities or given some symbolic significance. These items are mainly quartz crystals, but also other minerals such as cerussite, iron pyrite, calcite and galena. A few findings feature modifications, such as:

- a mammoth tooth with an incision and a fossil nummulite shell with a cross etched in from Tata, Hungary;
- a large slab with 18 cupstones hollowed out from a grave in La Ferrassie, France;
- and a geode from Peștera Cioarei, Romania, coated with red ochre.

A number of fossil shells are also known from French Neanderthal sites, such as:

- a rhynchonellid and a Taraebratulina from Combe Grenal;
- a belemnite beak from Grottes des Canalettes; a polyp from Grotte de l'Hyène;
- a sea urchin from La Gonterie-Boulouneix;
- and a rhynchonella, feather star, and belemnite beak from the contentious Châtelperronian layer of Grotte du Renne.

=== Music ===
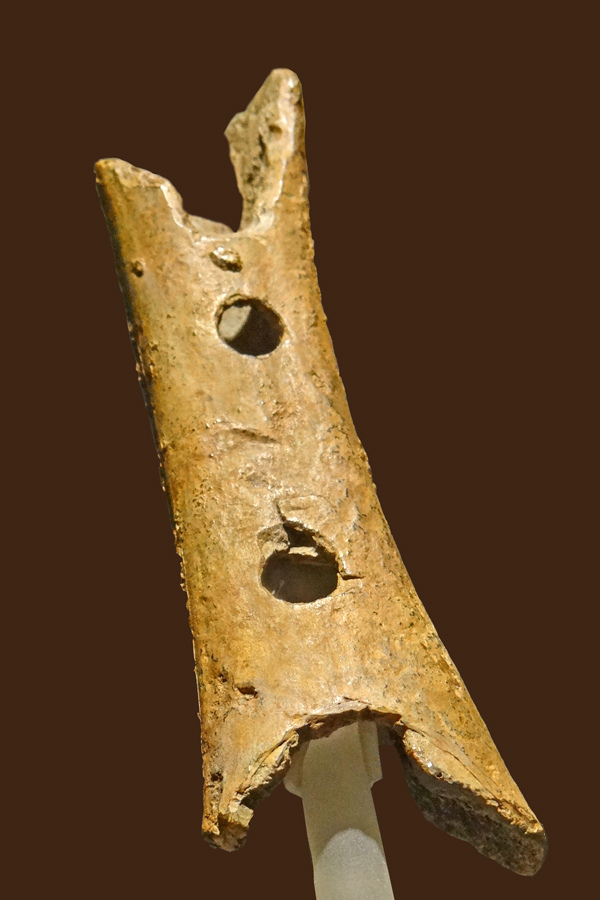
The Divje Babe Flute in the National Museum of Slovenia

Purported Neanderthal bone flute fragments made of bear long bones were reported from Potočka zijalka, Slovenia, in the 1920s, and Istállós-kői-barlang, Hungary, and Mokriška jama, Slovenia, in 1985; but these are now attributed to Cro-Magnons.

The 43,000-year-old Divje Babe flute from Slovenia, discovered in 1995, has been attributed to Neanderthals, though its status as a flute is heavily disputed. Many researchers consider it to be most likely the product of a carnivorous animal chewing the bone, but its discoverer Ivan Turk and other researchers have continued to argue that it was manufactured by Neanderthals as a musical instrument.

== Handheld tools ==
=== Stone ===
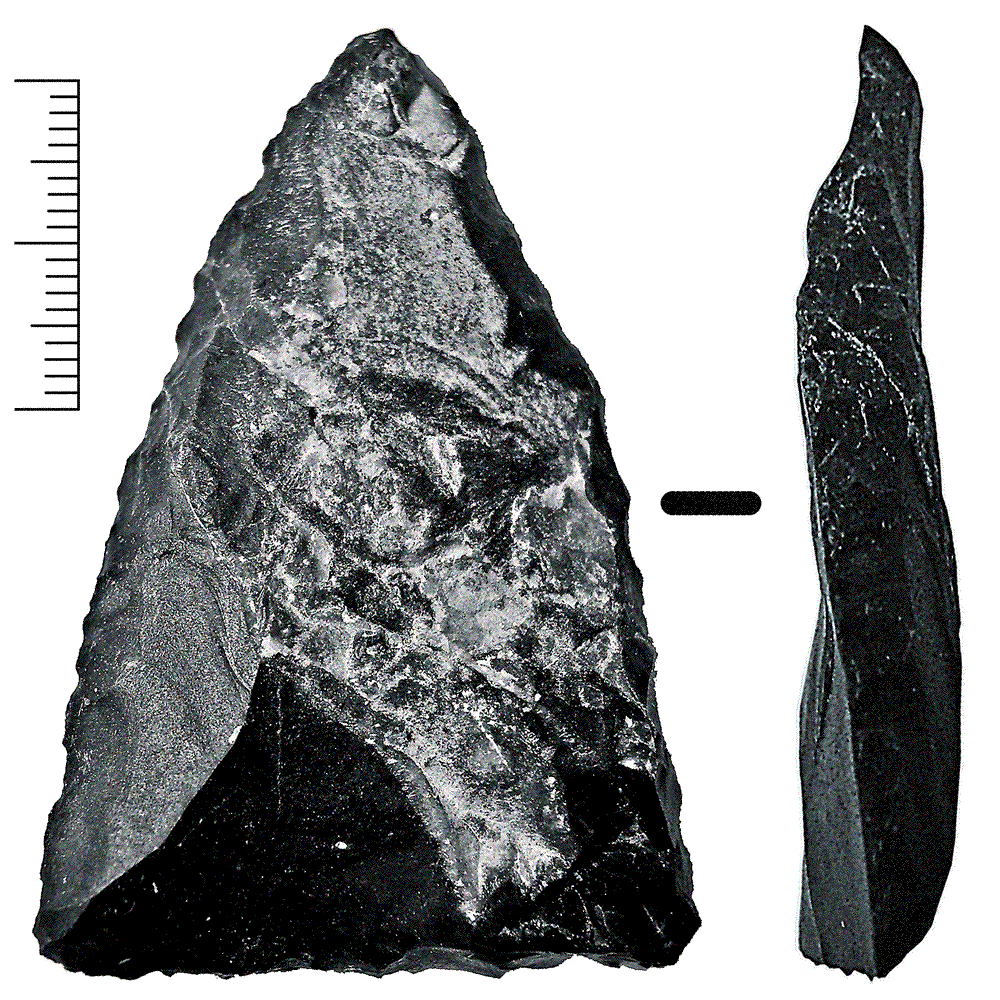
Mousterian point

The archaeological record demonstrates a long 150,000-year stagnation in Neanderthal lithic innovation, which may have followed from the low population density and high injury rate, preventing especially complex technologies from being taught to the next generation. Still, Neanderthal lithic technology did achieve some complexities.

Neanderthals are associated with the Mousterian industry. The Mousterian is also associated with North African H. sapiens as early as 315,000 years ago and was found in Northern China about 47–37,000 years ago in caves such as Jinsitai or Tongtiandong. In Europe, it was invented around 300,000 years ago with the Levallois technique, which developed directly from the Acheulean industry (invented by H. erectus about 1.8 million years ago). Levallois made it easier to control flake shape and size.

There are distinct regional variants of the Mousterian industry, such as:

- the Quina and La Ferrassie subtypes of the Charentian industry in southwestern France
- the Acheulean-tradition Mousterian subtypes A and B along the Atlantic and northwestern European coasts
- the Denticulate Mousterian industry in Western Europe
- the racloir industry around the Zagros Mountains
- the flake cleaver industry of Cantabria, Spain, and both sides of the Pyrenees
- the Micoquian industry of Central and Eastern Europe and the related Sibiryachikha variant in the Siberian Altai Mountains

In the mid-20th century, French archaeologist François Bordes debated against American archaeologist Lewis Binford to explain this diversity (the "Bordes–Binford debate"), with Bordes arguing that these represent unique ethnic traditions and Binford that they were a response to varying environments (essentially, form vs. function). The latter sentiment would indicate a lower degree of inventiveness compared to Cro-Magnons, adapting the same tools to different environments rather than creating new technologies. A continuous sequence of occupation is well documented in Grotte du Renne, France, where the lithic tradition can be divided into the Levallois–Charentian, Discoid–Denticulate (43,300±929 – 40,900±719 years ago), Levallois Mousterian (40,200±1,500 – 38,400±1,300 years ago), and Châtelperronian (40,930±393 – 33,670±450 years ago).

There is some debate about whether Neanderthals had long-range weapons. A wound on the neck of an African wild ass from Umm el Tlel, Syria, was likely inflicted by a heavy Levallois-point javelin, and bone trauma consistent with habitual throwing has been reported in Neanderthals. Some spear tips from Abri du Maras, France, may have been too fragile to have been used as thrusting spears, possibly suggesting their use as darts.

=== Bone ===
The Châtelperronian in central France and northern Spain is a distinct industry from the Mousterian, and is controversially hypothesised to represent a culture of Neanderthals borrowing (or through acculturation) tool-making techniques from immigrating modern humans, crafting bone tools and ornaments. In this frame, the makers would have been a transitional culture between the Neanderthal Mousterian and the modern human Aurignacian. The opposing viewpoint is that the Châtelperronian was manufactured by Cro-Magnons instead. Abrupt transitions similar to the Mousterian/Châtelperronian could also simply represent natural innovation, like the La Quina–Neronian transition 50,000 years ago featuring technologies generally associated with modern humans such as bladelets and microliths. Other ambiguous transitional cultures include the Italian Uluzzian industry, and the Balkan Szeletian industry.

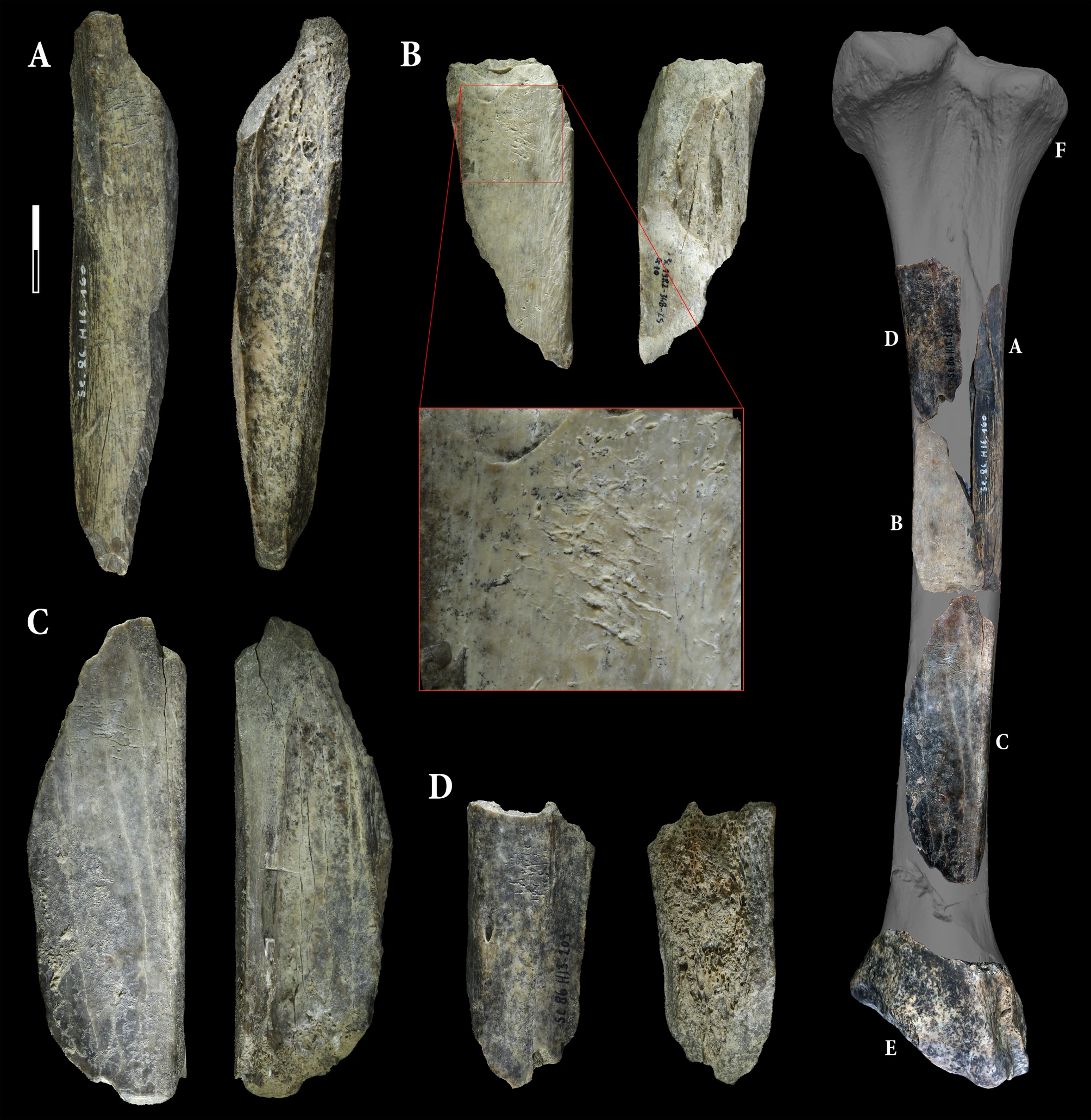
The four bone retouchers made of a cave lion tibia from Sclayn Cave, Belgium

Before modern human immigration, the only evidence of Neanderthal bone tools are a 50,000 year old bone spear point from Abric Romaní, Spain; four 130,000 year old multi-tools made of a cave lion tibia from Sclayn Cave, Belgium; as well as some animal rib lissoirs which are rubbed against hide to make it more supple or waterproof. This could also be evidence for modern humans immigrating earlier than expected. In 2013, two 51,400- to 41,100-year-old deer rib lissoirs were reported from Pech-de-l'Azé and the nearby Abri Peyrony in France. In 2020, five more lissoirs made of aurochs or bison ribs were reported from Abri Peyrony, with one dating to about 51,400 years ago and the other four to 47,700–41,100 years ago. This indicates the technology was in use in this region for a long time. Since reindeer remains were the most abundant, the use of less abundant bovine ribs may indicate a specific preference for bovine ribs. Potential lissoirs have also been reported from Grosse Grotte, Germany (mammoth), and Grottes des Canalettes, France (red deer).

It is possible that the Neanderthals at Kebara Cave, Israel, used the shells of the spur-thighed tortoise as containers.

=== Shell ===
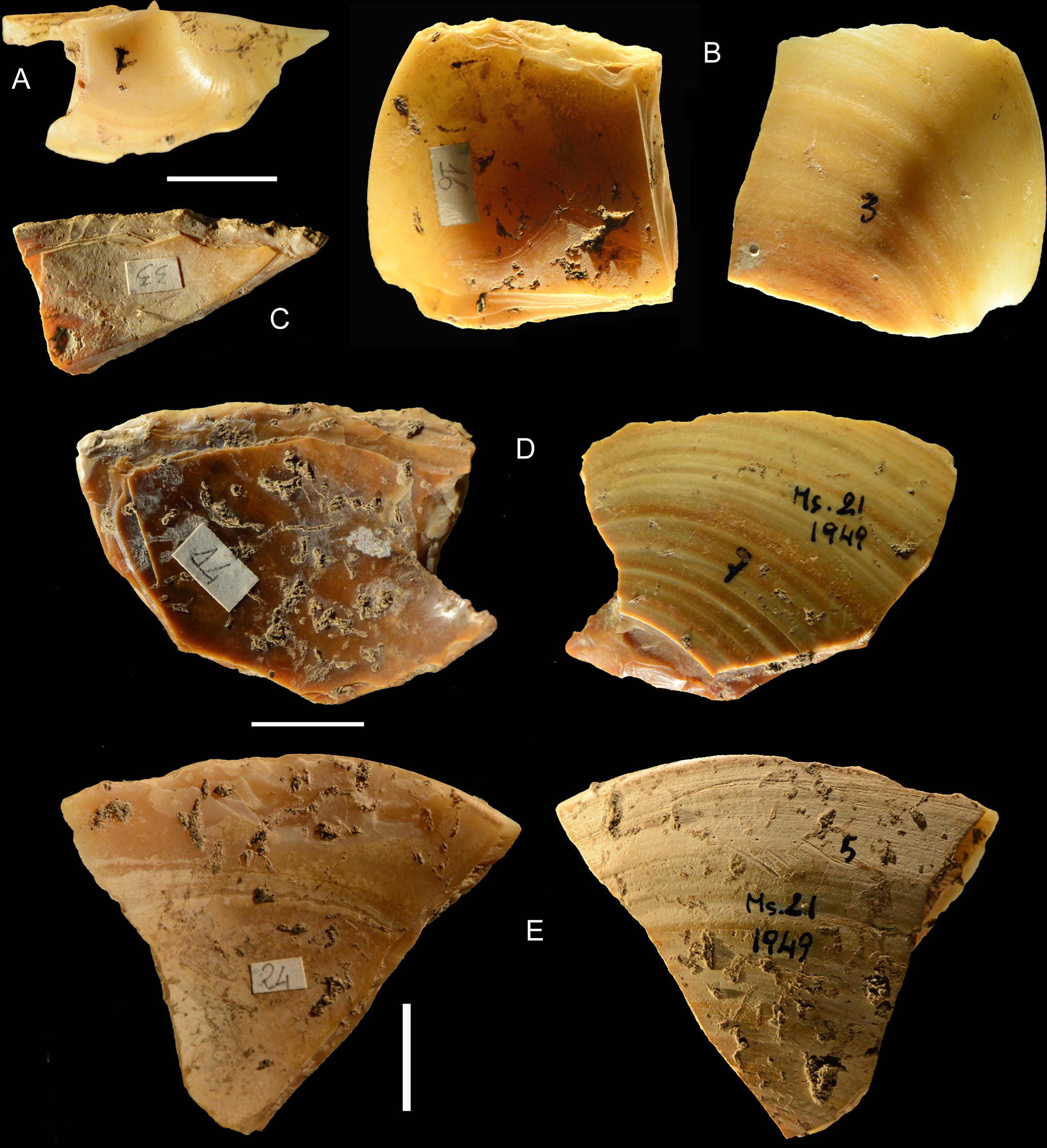
Smooth clam shell scrapers from Grotta dei Moscerini, Italy

The Neanderthals at 10 coastal sites in Italy (namely Grotta del Cavallo and Grotta dei Moscerini) and Kalamakia Cave, Greece, are known to have crafted scrapers using smooth clam shells, and possibly hafted them to a wooden handle. They probably chose this clam species because it has the most durable shell. At Grotta dei Moscerini, about 24% of the shells were gathered alive from the seafloor, meaning these Neanderthals had to wade or dive into shallow waters to collect them.

At Grotta di Santa Lucia, Italy, in the Campanian volcanic arc, Neanderthals collected porous volcanic pumice, which, for Cro-Magnons, was probably used for polishing points and needles. The pumices are associated with shell tools.

=== Plant ===
At Abri du Maras, France, twisted fibres and a 3-ply inner-bark-fibre cord fragment associated with Neanderthals show that they produced string and cordage. It is unclear how widespread this technology was because the materials used to make them (such as animal hair, hide, sinew, or plant fibres) are biodegradable and preserve very poorly. Dating to 52–41,000 years ago, the cord fragment is the oldest direct evidence of fibre technology, although 115,000-year-old perforated shell beads from Cueva Antón, possibly strung together to make a necklace, are the oldest indirect evidence. In 2020, British archaeologist Rebecca Wragg Sykes expressed cautious support for the genuineness of the find, but pointed out that the string would have been so weak that it would have had limited functions, such as stringing small objects.

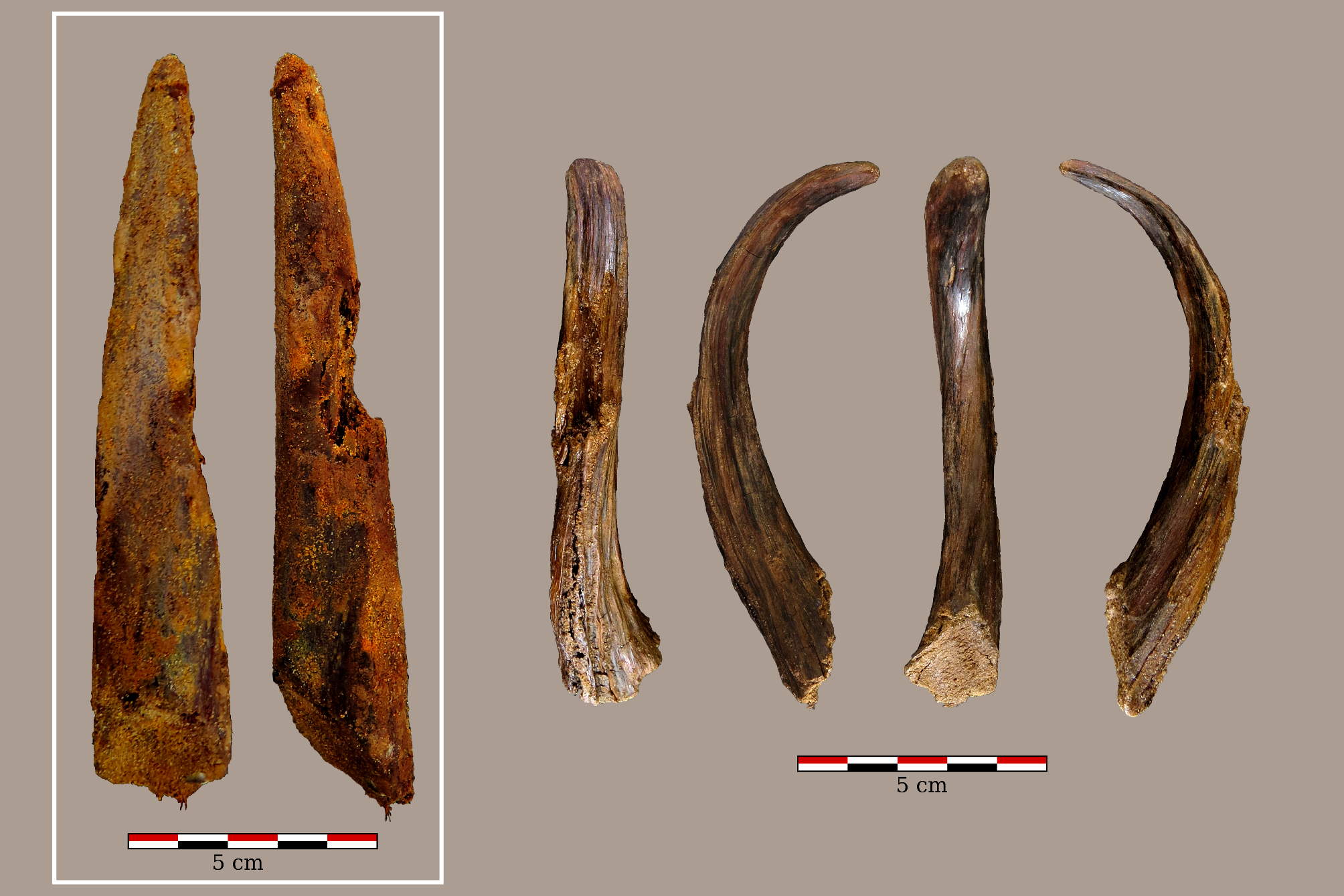
Digging stick from Aranbaltza III, Spain

At the Italian Poggetti Vecchi site, there is evidence that they used fire to process boxwood branches to make digging sticks, a common implement in hunter-gatherer societies.

Neanderthals produced the adhesive birch bark tar, using the bark of birch trees, for hafting. It was long believed that birch bark tar was an intensely complicated procedure evincing complex cognitive skills and strong cultural transmission, until a 2019 study showed it can be made simply by burning birch bark beside smooth vertical surfaces, such as a flat, inclined rock. Though some communities may not have needed cultural processes to maintain the technology, the Neanderthals at Königsaue, Germany, employed a technically more demanding underground production method, which may demonstrate some cumulative cultural practices.

The archaeological record shows that Neanderthals commonly used animal hide and birch bark, and may have used them to make cooking containers. This is based largely on circumstantial evidence, as neither fossilises well.

== Fire and construction ==
Many Neanderthal sites have evidence of fire, some for extended periods of time, though it is unclear whether they were capable of starting fire or simply scavenged from naturally occurring wildfires. Indirect evidence of fire-starting ability includes pyrite residue on a couple of dozen bifaces from roughly 50,000 years ago in northwestern France. This could indicate they were used as percussion fire starters. Some Neanderthals around this time were collecting manganese dioxide, which can lower the combustion temperature of wood. They may have been using fire for cooking, keeping warm, and deterring predators. They were also capable of zoning areas for specific activities, such as knapping, butchering, hearths, and wood storage. Many Neanderthal sites lack evidence for such activity, perhaps due to natural degradation of the area over tens of thousands of years, such as bear infiltration following the settlement abandonment.

In a number of caves, evidence of hearths has been detected. Neanderthals likely considered air circulation when making hearths, as a lack of proper ventilation for a single hearth can render a cave uninhabitable in several minutes. Abric Romaní rock shelter, Spain, indicates eight evenly spaced hearths lined up against the rock wall, likely used to stay warm while sleeping, with one person sleeping on either side of the fire. At Cueva de Bolomor, Spain, with hearths lined up against the wall, the smoke flowed upwards to the ceiling, and led to outside the cave. In Grotte du Lazaret, France, smoke was probably naturally ventilated during the winter as the interior cave temperature was greater than the outside temperature; likewise, the cave was likely only inhabited in the winter.

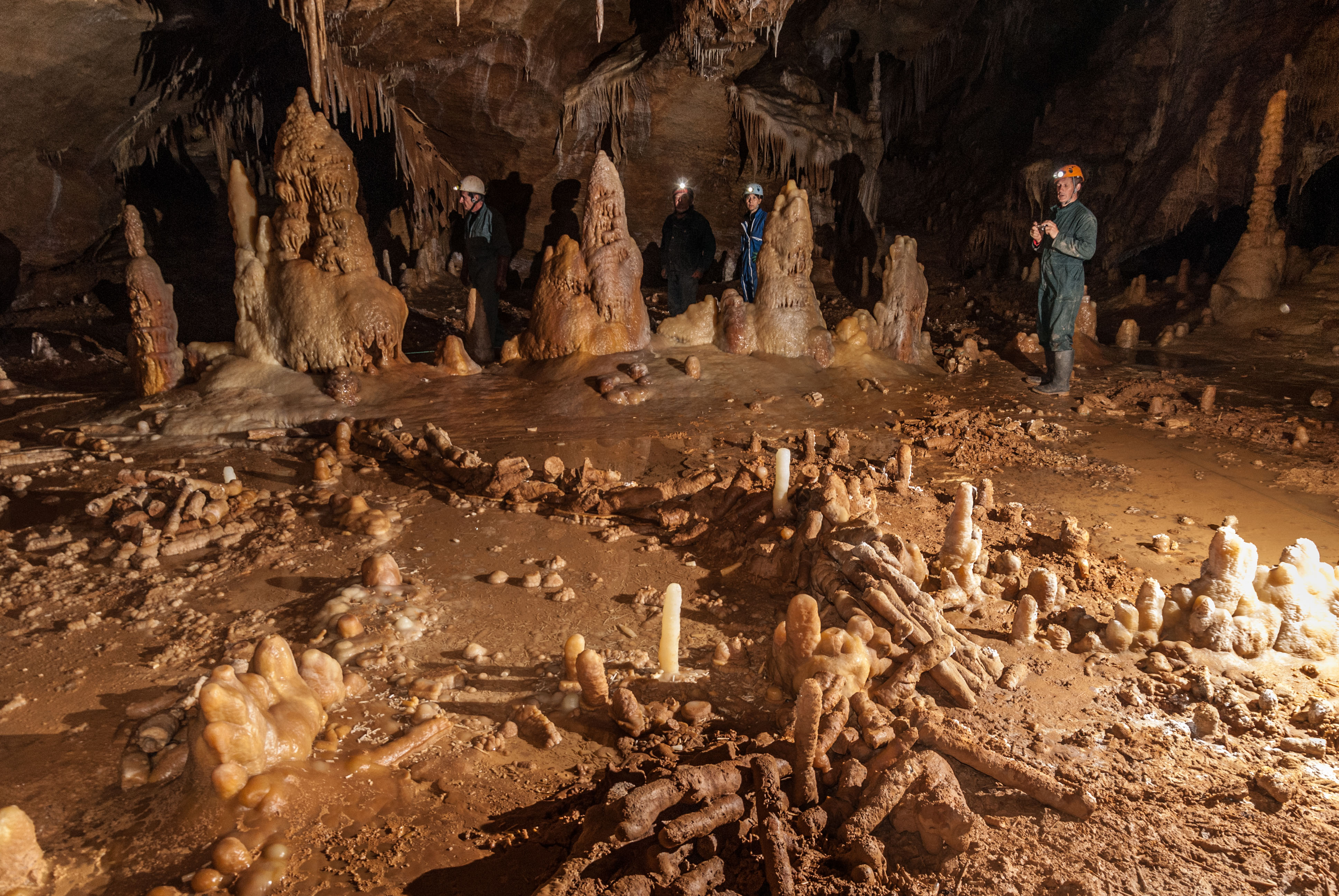
The ring structures in Grotte de Bruniquel, France

In 1990, two 176,000-year-old ring structures, several metres wide, made of broken stalagmite pieces, were discovered in a large chamber more than 300 m (980 ft) from the entrance within Grotte de Bruniquel, France. One ring was 6.7 m × 4.5 m (22 ft × 15 ft) with stalagmite pieces averaging 34.4 cm (13.5 in) in length, and the other 2.2 m × 2.1 m (7.2 ft × 6.9 ft) with pieces averaging 29.5 cm (11.6 in). There were also four other piles of stalagmite pieces for a total of 112 m (367 ft) or 2.2 t (2.4 short tons) worth of stalagmite pieces. Evidence of fire use and burnt bones also suggests human activity. A team of Neanderthals was likely necessary to construct the structure, but the chamber's actual purpose is uncertain. Building complex structures so deep in a cave is unprecedented in the archaeological record, and indicates sophisticated lighting and construction technology, and great familiarity with subterranean environments.

== Clothes ==
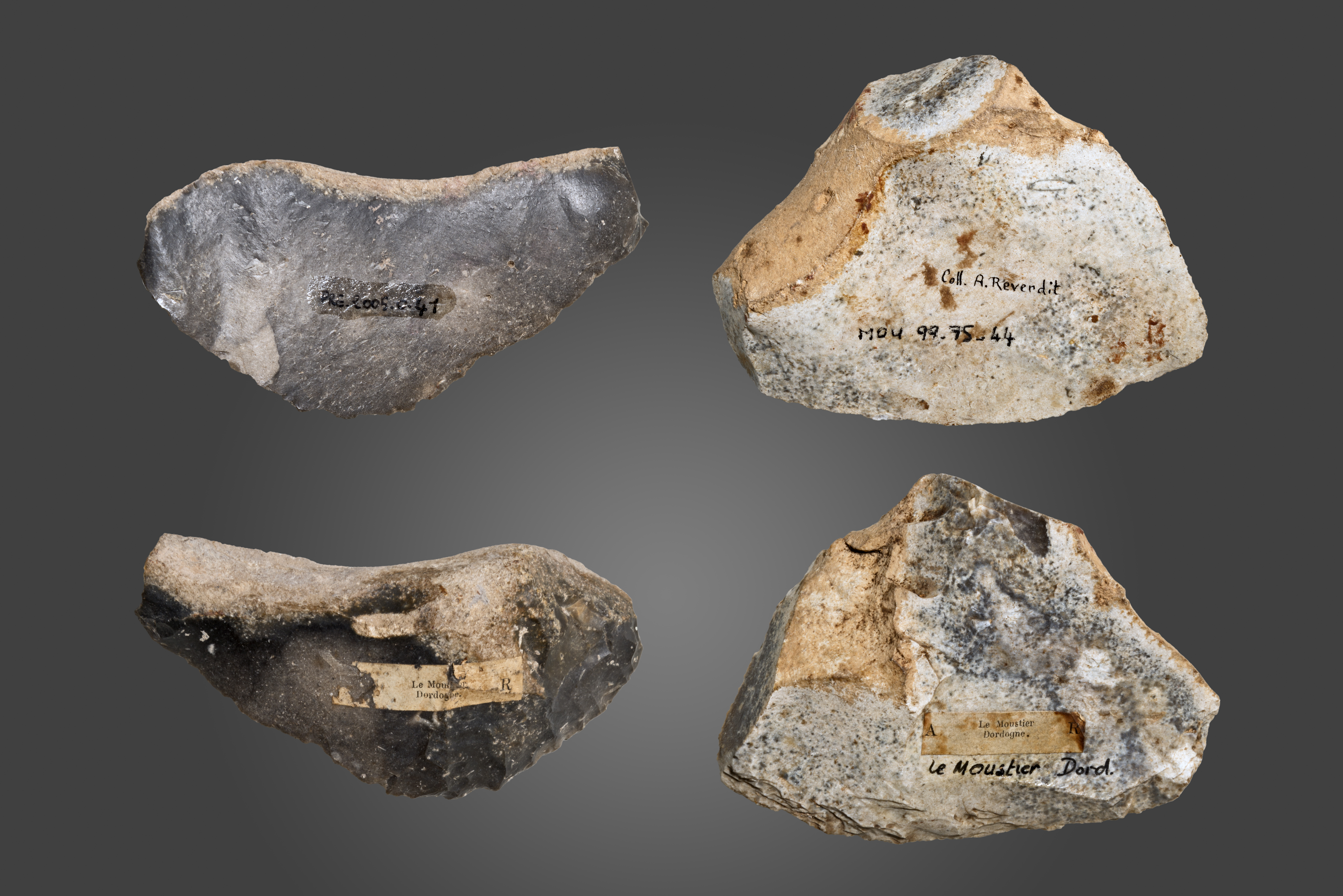
Two racloir side scrapers from Le Moustier, France

Unlike the bone sewing-needles and stitching awls found in Cro-Magnon sites, the only known Neanderthal tools that could have been used to fashion clothes are hide scrapers. These could have been used to make items similar to blankets or ponchos, and there is no direct evidence that they could produce fitted clothing. Indirect evidence of tailoring by Neanderthals includes the ability to manufacture string, which could indicate weaving ability, and a naturally-pointed horse metatarsal bone from Cueva de los Aviones, Spain, which was speculated to have been used as an awl to perforate dyed hides, based on the presence of orange pigments. Whatever the case, Neanderthals would have needed to cover up most of their body, and Cro-Magnons would have covered 80–90%.

Since modern human/Neanderthal admixture is known to have occurred in the Middle East, and no modern body louse species descends from their Neanderthal counterparts (body lice only inhabit clothed individuals), it is possible that Neanderthals (and/or modern humans) in hotter climates did not wear clothes, or Neanderthal lice were highly specialised.

== Seafaring ==
There are claims of Neanderthal seafaring activity. Remains of Middle Palaeolithic stone tools on Greek islands have been alleged to indicate early seafaring by Neanderthals in the Ionian Sea, possibly starting as far back as 150,000 to 200,000 years ago. The oldest stone artefacts from Crete date to 107,000 to 130,000 years ago, Cephalonia 125,000 years ago, and Zakynthos 35,000 to 110,000 years ago. The makers of these artefacts may have employed simple reed boats and made one-day crossings back and forth. Other Mediterranean islands with such early remains include Sardinia, Melos, Alonnisos, and Naxos (although Naxos may have been connected to land). If they could cross major waterbodies, it is possible they crossed the Strait of Gibraltar. If this interpretation is correct, Neanderthals' ability to engineer boats and navigate through open waters would speak to their advanced cognitive and technical skills.

British archaeologist Cyprian Broodbank finds most of the evidence unconvincing. He considers Cephalonia the most convincing, and Neanderthals may have made brief visits to small islands. There are no British Neanderthal fossils dating to when the region was probably an island, only when it was likely connected to the continent.

== Medicine ==
Neanderthals appear to have lived lives of frequent traumatic injury and recovery. Well-healed major fractures on many bones indicate the setting of splints. Individuals with severe head and rib traumas (which would have caused massive blood loss) indicate they had some manner of dressing major wounds, such as bandages made from animal skin. By and large, they appear to have avoided severe infections, indicating good long-term treatment of such wounds.

Their knowledge of medicinal plants was comparable to that of Cro-Magnons. An individual at Cueva del Sidrón, Spain, seems to have been medicating a dental abscess using poplar—which contains salicylic acid, the active ingredient in aspirin—and there were also traces of the antibiotic-producing Penicillium chrysogenum. They may also have used yarrow and camomile, and their bitter taste—which should act as a deterrent as it could indicate poison—means it was likely a deliberate act. At the Kebara Cave in Israel, plant remains which have historically been used for their medicinal properties were found, including the common grape vine, the pistachios of the Persian turpentine tree, ervil seeds and oak acorns.

In 2026, research into a 59,000‑year‑old Neanderthal tooth found in Chagyrskaya, Siberia, indicated that a stone drill had been used to treat a dental cavity. This predates the earliest known example of dental drilling by Homo sapiens by more than 40,000 years.

== Language ==
It is unclear if Neanderthals had the capacity for complex language, but some researchers have argued that Neanderthals required complex communications to discuss locations, hunting, gathering, and tool-making techniques in order to survive in their harsh environment. In experiments with modern humans, the Levallois technique can be taught with purely observational learning without spoken instruction.

The FOXP2 gene in modern humans is associated with speech and language development. FOXP2 was present in Neanderthals, but not the gene's modern human variant. Neurologically, Neanderthals had an expanded Broca's area—operating the formulation of sentences, and speech comprehension, but out of a group of 48 genes believed to affect the neural substrate of language, 11 had different methylation patterns between Neanderthals and modern humans. This could indicate a stronger ability in modern humans than in Neanderthals to express language.

== Religion ==
=== Funerals ===
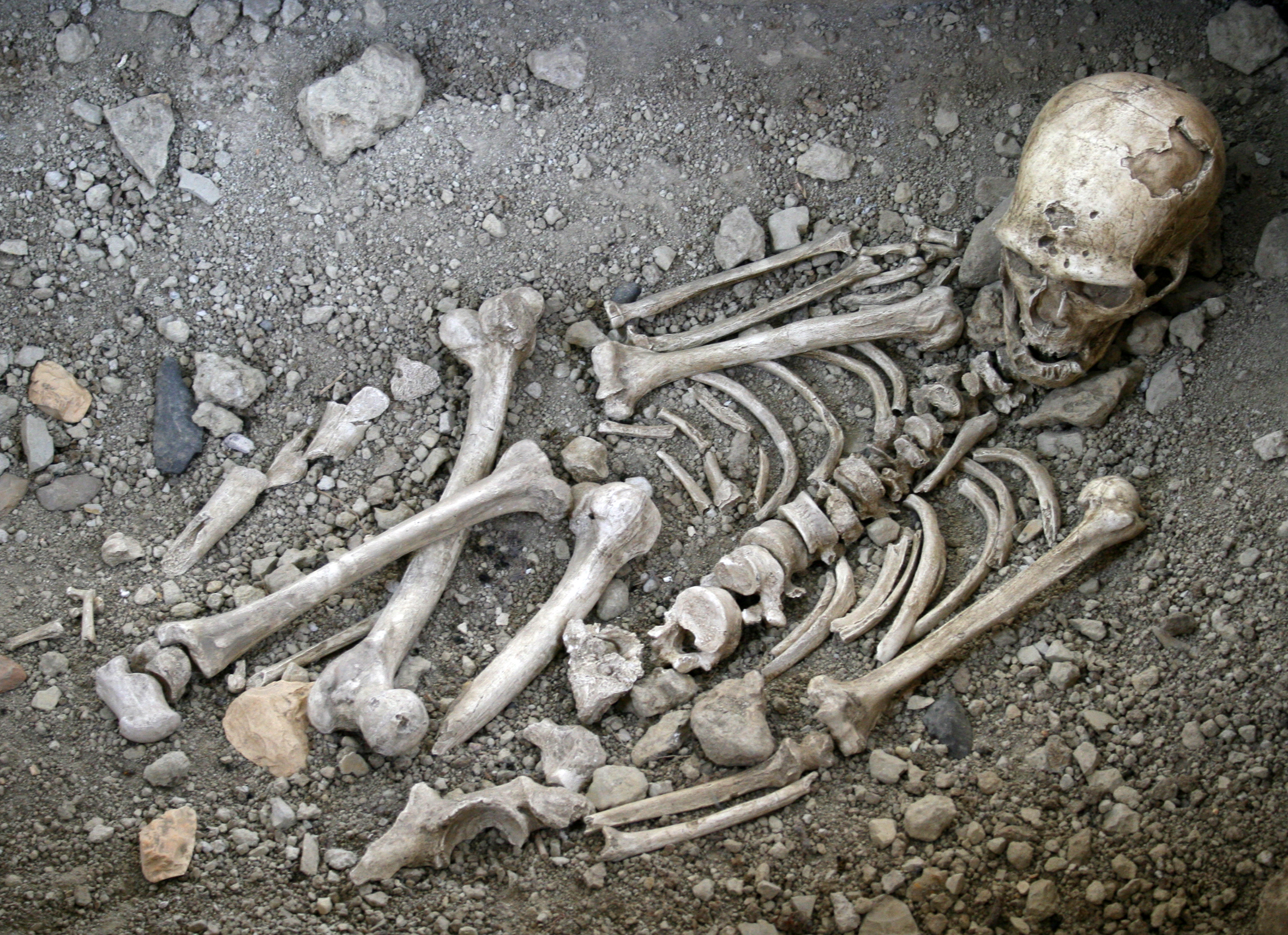
Reconstruction of the grave of La Chapelle-aux-Saints 1 at the Musée de La Chapelle-aux-Saints

Neanderthals buried their dead, at least occasionally, which may explain the abundance of fossil remains. The behaviour is not indicative of a religious belief of life after death because it could also have had non-symbolic motivations.

Estimates of known Neanderthal burials range from 36 to 60. The oldest uncontested burials do not seem to occur before approximately 70,000 years ago. The small number of recorded Neanderthal burials implies that the activity was not particularly common. The setting of inhumation in Neanderthal culture largely consisted of simple, shallow graves and pits. Sites such as La Ferrassie in France or Shanidar in Iraq may imply the existence of mortuary centers or cemeteries in Neanderthal culture due to the number of individuals found buried at them.

The debate on Neanderthal funerals has been active since the 1908 discovery of La Chapelle-aux-Saints 1, a small, artificial hole in a cave in southwestern France, which was controversially proposed as a site of a symbolic burial. Another grave at Shanidar Cave, Iraq, was associated with the pollen of several flowers that may have been in bloom at the time of deposition—yarrow, centaury, ragwort, grape hyacinth, joint pine and hollyhock. The medicinal properties of the plants led American archaeologist Ralph Solecki to claim that the man buried was some leader, healer, or shaman, and that "The association of flowers with Neanderthals adds a whole new dimension to our knowledge of his humanness, indicating that he had 'soul' ". It is also possible that the pollen was deposited by a small rodent after the man's death.

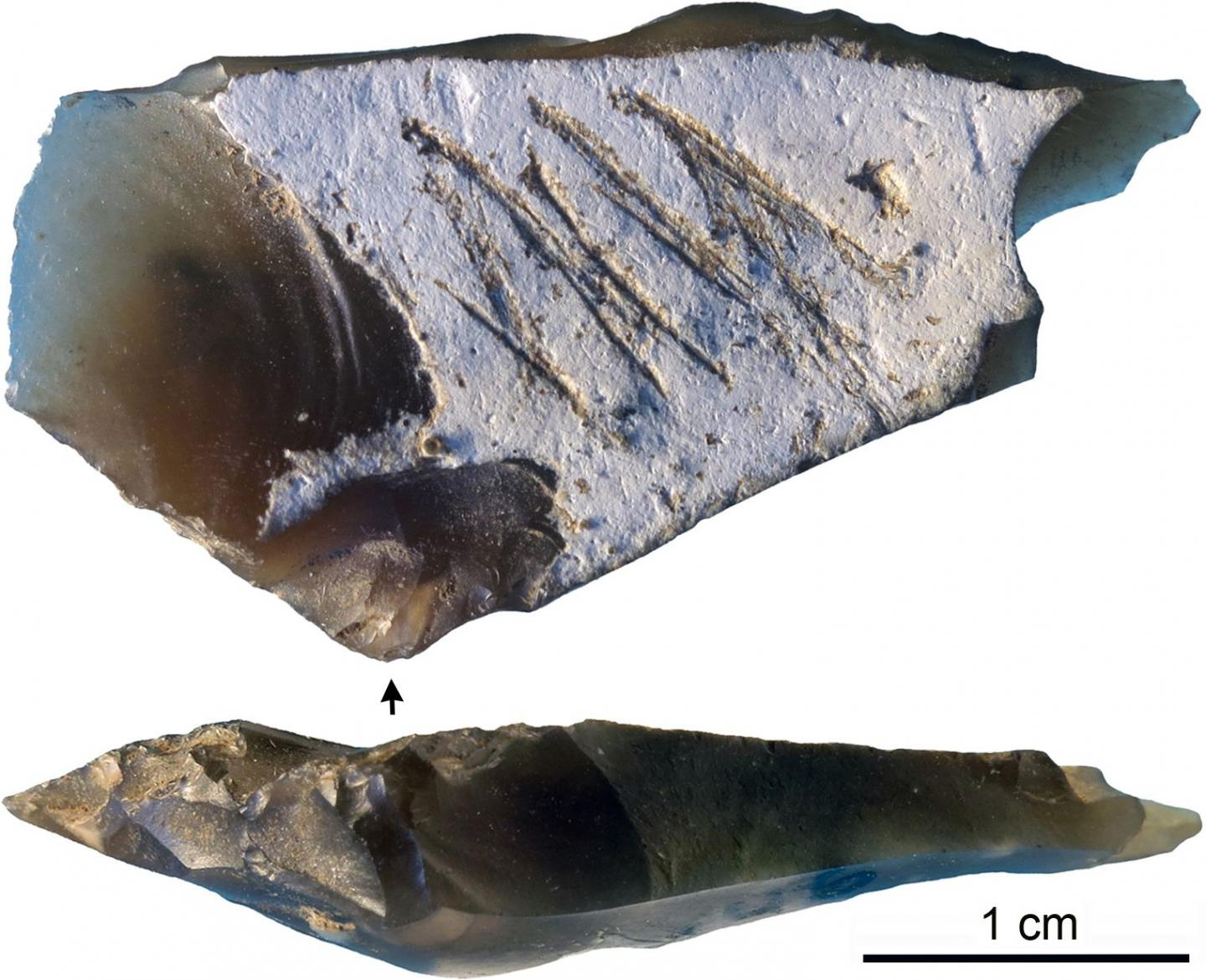
Engraved flint from a Neanderthal grave at Kiik-Koba, Crimea

The graves of children and infants, especially, are associated with grave goods such as artefacts and bones. The grave of a newborn from La Ferrassie, France, was found with three flint scrapers, and an infant from Dederiyeh Cave, Syria, was found with a triangular flint placed on its chest. A 10-month-old from Amud Cave, Israel, was associated with a red deer mandible, likely purposefully placed there, given that other animal remains are now reduced to fragments. Teshik-Tash 1 from Uzbekistan was associated with a circle of ibex horns, and a limestone slab was argued to have supported the head. The worth and significance of these grave goods are unclear.

=== Cults ===
It was once argued that, in some European caves, the bones of the cave bear, particularly the skull, were arranged in a specific order, indicating an ancient bear cult that killed bears and then ceremoniously arranged the bones. This would be consistent with bear-related rituals of recent Arctic hunter-gatherers. The alleged peculiarity of the arrangement could also be sufficiently explained by natural causes. There may also be confirmation bias here with the idea that totemism was the earliest religion.

It was also once thought that Neanderthals ritually hunted, killed, and cannibalised other Neanderthals, with the skull becoming the focus of some ceremony. In 1962, Italian palaeontologist Alberto Blanc believed a skull from Grotta Guattari, Italy, had evidence of a swift blow to the head—indicative of ritual murder—and a precise and deliberate incising at the base to access the brain. He compared it to the victims of headhunters in Malaysia and Borneo, putting it forward as evidence of a skull cult. It can also be sufficiently explained by cave hyaena scavengery. Although Neanderthals are known to have practised cannibalism, there is insufficient evidence to suggest ritual defleshing.

In 2019, Gibraltarian palaeoanthropologists Stewart, Geraldine, and Clive Finlayson, and Spanish archaeologist Francisco Guzmán speculated that the golden eagle had iconic value to Neanderthals, as it does in some recent societies. They reported that golden eagle bones showed a conspicuously high rate of evidence of modification compared to those of other birds, supporting a "Cult of the Sun Bird" in which the golden eagle was a symbol of power. There is evidence from Krapina, Croatia, from wear use and even remnants of string, that suggests that raptor talons were worn as personal ornaments.

== See also ==
- Behavioral modernity
- Early modern human
- Evolution of human intelligence
- Origins of society

== Bibliography ==
- Broodbank, Cyprian (2013). The Making of the Middle Sea: A History of the Mediterranean from the Beginning to the Emergence of the Classical World. London, UK: Thames & Hudson. ISBN 978-0-500-29208-2.
- Brown, K.; Fa, D. A.; Finlayson, G.; Finlayson, C. (2011). "Small game and marine resource exploitation by Neanderthals: the evidence from Gibraltar". Trekking the shore: changing coastlines and the antiquity of coastal settlement. Interdisciplinary contributions to archaeology. Springer. ISBN 978-1-4419-8218-6.
- Finlayson, C. (2019). The smart Neanderthal: bird catching, cave art, and the cognitive revolution. Oxford University Press. ISBN 978-0-19-251812-5.
- Papagianni, D.; Morse, M. A. (2013). "Still with us?". Neanderthals rediscovered: how modern science is rewriting their story. Thames and Hudson. ISBN 978-0-500-77311-6.
- Pettitt, Paul; White, Mark (2012). The British Palaeolithic: hominin societies at the edge of the Pleistocene world. London: Routledge. ISBN 978-0-415-67454-6.
- Romagnoli, Francesca; Rivals, Florent; Benazzi, Stefano (2022). Updating Neanderthals: Understanding Behavioural Complexity in the Late Middle Palaeolithic. Academic Press. ISBN 978-0-12-821429-9.
- Shipman, P. (2015). "How humans and their dogs drove Neanderthals to extinction". The invaders: how humans and their dogs drove Neanderthals to extinction. Harvard University Press. doi:10.2307/j.ctvjf9zbs. ISBN 978-0-674-42538-5. JSTOR j.ctvjf9zbs.
- Sykes, Rebecca Wragg (2020). Kindred: Neanderthal Life, Love, Death and Art. London, UK: Bloomsbury Sigma. ISBN 978-1-4729-3749-0.
- Tattersall, I. (2015). "Neanderthals, DNA, and creativity". The strange case of the Rickety Cossack: and other cautionary tales from human evolution. St. Martin's Publishing Group. ISBN 978-1-4668-7943-0.
