= Cueva Antón =

Cave and archaeological site in Spain

- Cueva Antón
- Location in Spain Cueva Antón (Spain)
- 38°3′51.84″N 1°29′47.20″W
- Location: Mula basin

Site notes
- Archaeologists: João Zilhão

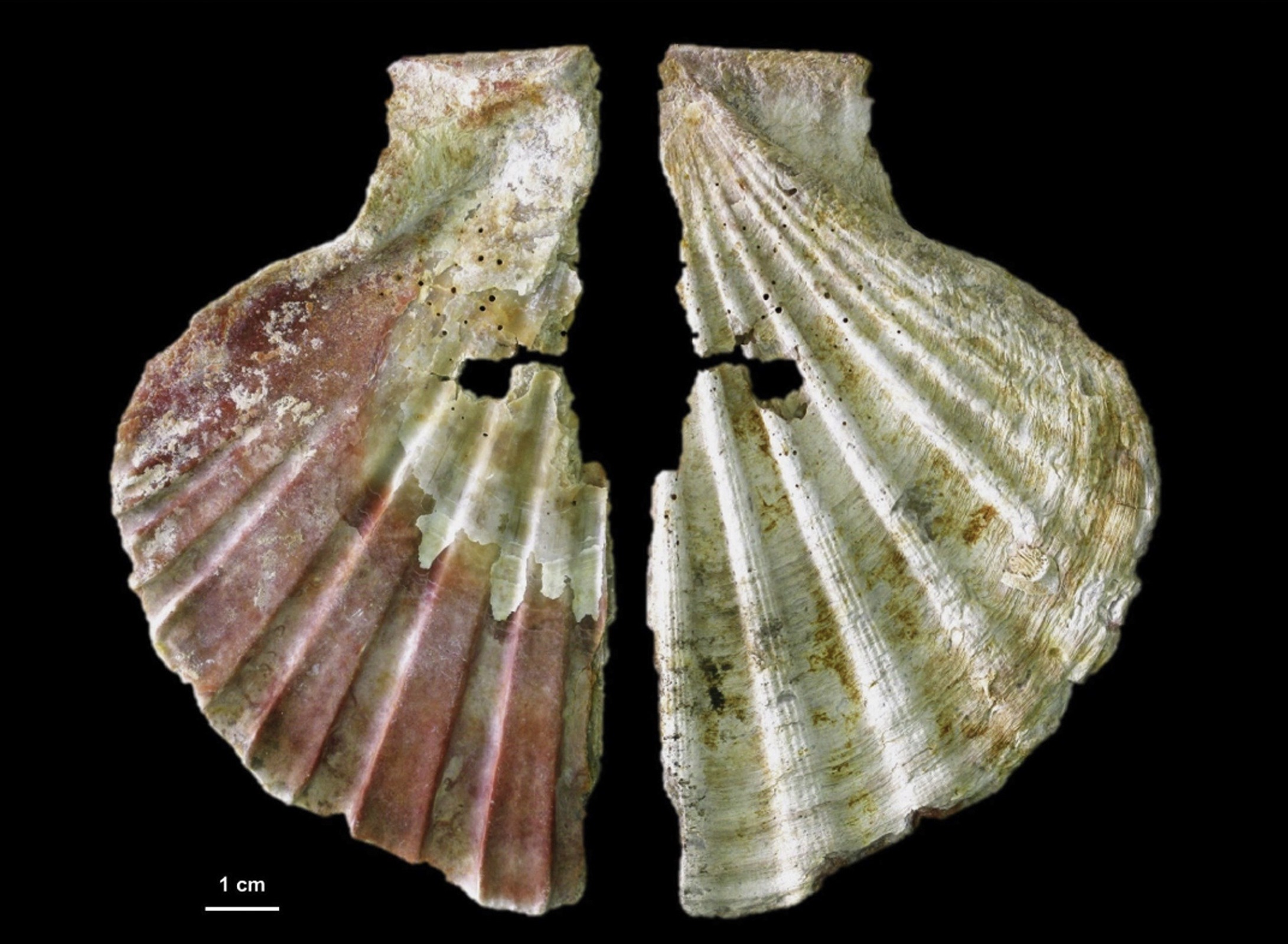
Decorated shell from Cueva Antón

Cueva Antón is a paleoanthropological and archeological site in the Region of Murcia of southeast Spain. The cave is located about 60 kilometers from the Mediterranean port city of Cartagena inland in the territory of the municipality of Mula. It was eroded by the Río Mula and served as a cave in the Middle Palaeolithic inhabited by Neanderthals. The cave became internationally known in 2010, after a shell at least 43,000 years old with adhering orange pigment was discovered there. The pigment found was interpreted as evidence that the shell was used "in an aesthetic and probably symbolic" way. The find from the Cueva Antón was published together with similar finds from the Cave of Los Aviones; they were named as the first such Neanderthal jewelry found in Europe. The colonization of the Iberian Peninsula by modern man ( Homo sapiens ) took place only several thousand years after the creation of the jewelry from the Cueva Antón. This site is the last known place where Neanderthal people resided.

The rock of the cave is Eocene limestone. It is at the base of a 25 meter high cliff on the bank of the Río Mula. The base of the cave was filled with four meters of sediment.
