= Cave of Los Aviones =

Cave and archaeological site in Spain

- Cueva de Los Aviones
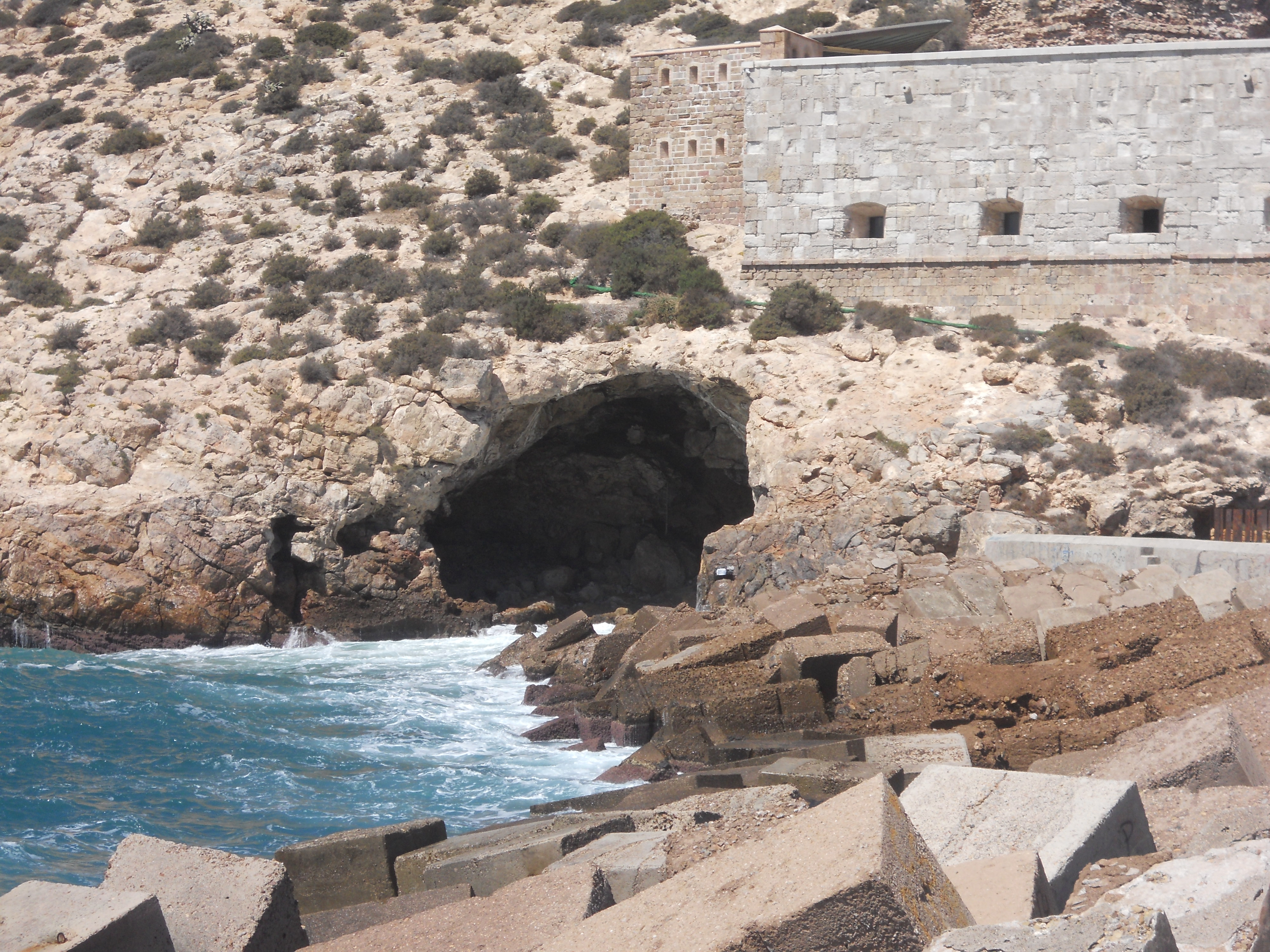
- The Cave of Los Aviones is located at sea level near Cartagena, Spain in the Mediterranean.

- Location within Spain
- Location: On the southeastern shore of Spain
- Coordinates: 37°35′7.30″N 0°59′8.66″W
- Elevation: sea level
- Geology: cemented marine conglomerate

The Cave of Los Aviones, located at sea level near Cartagena in southeastern Spain, is a paleontology site dating back to the Middle Paleolithic era. It is famous for having yielded in 2010 several perforated and painted seashell beads thought to have been crafted as jewelry by Neanderthals.

The cave is a cemented marine conglomerate. The site has yielded ochred and perforated marine shells, red and yellow colorants, and shell containers that feature residues of complex pigment mixtures. The pigments on the sea shells were dated to 115,000 years old, making these "the oldest personal ornamentation known anywhere in the world," predating Homo sapiens. Art is an archaeological proxy for symbolic behavior.
