= Neanderthal anatomy =

Anatomical composition of the Neanderthal body

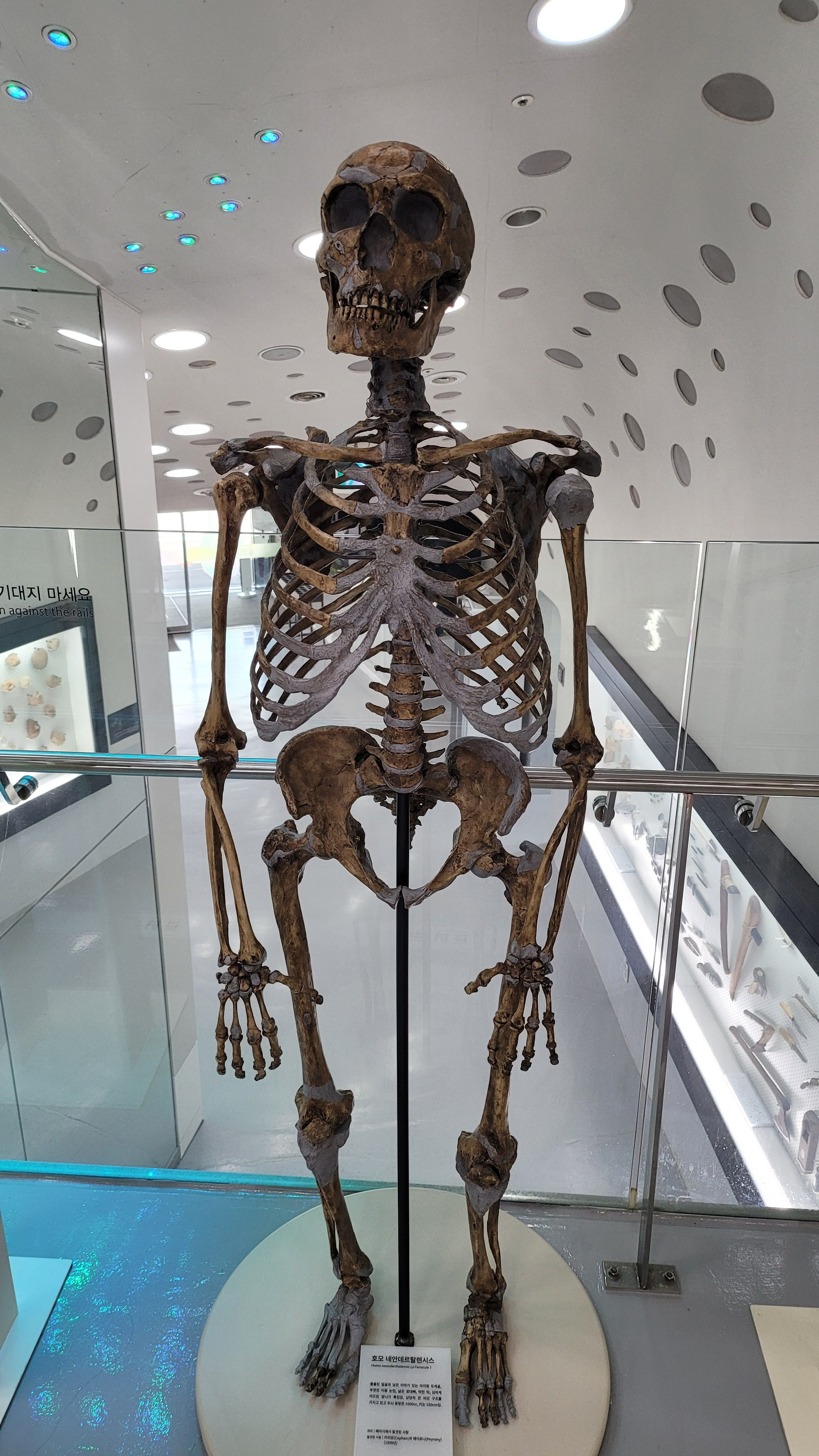
Neanderthal skeleton at the Jeongok Prehistory Museum

Neanderthal anatomy is characterised by a long, flat skull and a stocky body plan. When first discovered, Neanderthals were thought to be anatomically comparable to Aboriginal Australians, in accord with historical race concepts. As more fossils were discovered in the early 20th century, French palaeontologist Marcellin Boule defined them as a slouching, apelike species; a popular image until the middle of the century. Neanderthal features gradually accreted in European populations over the Middle Pleistocene, driven by natural selection in a cold climate, as well as genetic drift when populations crashed during glacial periods. This culminated in the "classical Neanderthal" anatomy by the Last Interglacial.

The Neanderthal skull is distinctive by namely a rounded supraorbital torus (brow ridge), large orbits (eye sockets) and nose, and an occipital bun at the back of the skull. The jaws and teeth are strong, which may have been a response to habitual heavy loading of the front teeth. The body is typically short and stocky, with an average size of 165 cm (5 ft 5 in) and 78 kg (172 lb) for males, and 155 cm (5 ft 1 in) and 66 kg (146 lb) for females. Short limbs may be an adaptation to the cold climate (Allen's rule) or to improve sprinting efficiency.

The brain is large, averaging 1,640 cc (100 cu in) in males and 1,460 cc (89 cu in) in females, larger than the average of any living population. The Neanderthal brain was organised much differently than the modern human brain, especially in regions related to cognition and language, which may be implicated in Neanderthal behaviour and the poorer evidence of material culture compared to Cro-Magnons.

Neanderthals may have developed mesopic vision in low-light conditions, and a stronger respiratory system to fuel a comparatively faster metabolism. It is unclear if Neanderthals could produce speech at the same level as modern humans. Neanderthal skin and hair colour may have ranged from dark to light. Red hair seems to have been a rare trait. Neanderthals may have had a faster growth rate than modern humans. Neanderthals suffered extensively from traumatic injury and major physical trauma, possibly as a consequence of risky hunting strategies and animal attacks. They also maintained a low population and genetic diversity, leading to inbreeding depression.

== Research history ==
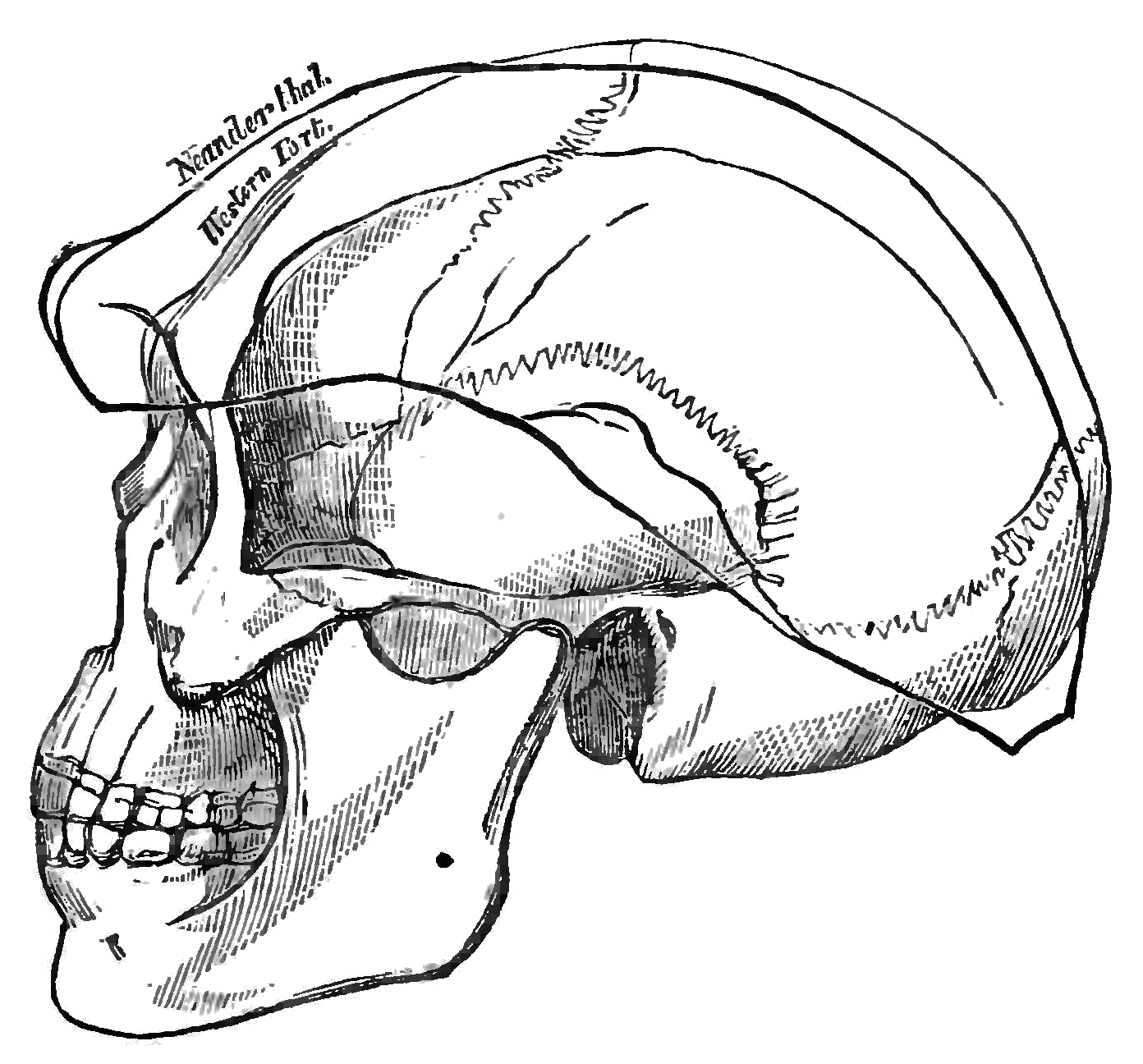
Thomas Huxley's 1863 illustration of an Aboriginal Australian skull overlain by Neanderthal 1, emphasising their similarity

When the first Neanderthal fossil, Neanderthal 1 (a skullcap), was discovered in 1856, initial reactions characterised it as belonging to a brutish, savage race of man. The low braincase and flattened forehead were often cited as evidence of its primitiveness, as classic markers of the lower races, in accord with historical race concepts. Consequently, the Neanderthal skull was often anatomically compared to most notably Aboriginal Australians, who were considered the most primitive race alive. German pathologist Rudolf Virchow interpreted Neanderthal characteristics as evidence of senility, disease, and malformation instead of archaicness, which stalled Neanderthal research until the end of the century.

By the early 20th century, numerous other Neanderthal discoveries were made, establishing H. neanderthalensis as a legitimate species. The most influential specimen was La Chapelle-aux-Saints 1 ("The Old Man") from La Chapelle-aux-Saints, France. French palaeontologist Marcellin Boule described him as a hairy, slouching, ape-like creature; a reconstruction which would endure until around the middle of the 20th century. By this point, several fossils from across the Old World were classified as "Neanderthaloid", a type of transitional fossil in human evolution halfway between Homo erectus and Homo sapiens. The modern anatomical definition of "Neanderthal" was formalised with the popularisation of cladistics in the late 1970s.

== Skeleton ==
=== Skull ===
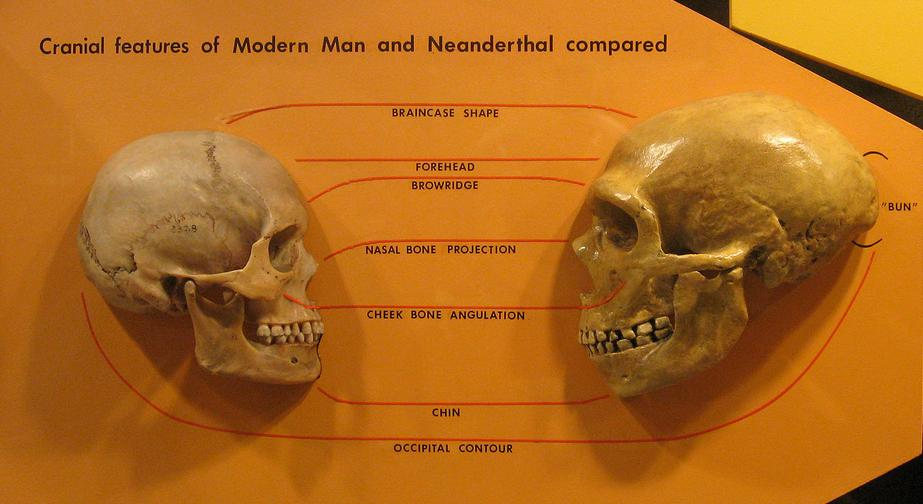
Comparisons of a modern Eurasian male example (left) and a Neanderthal (right) skull reconstruction at the Cleveland Museum of Natural History

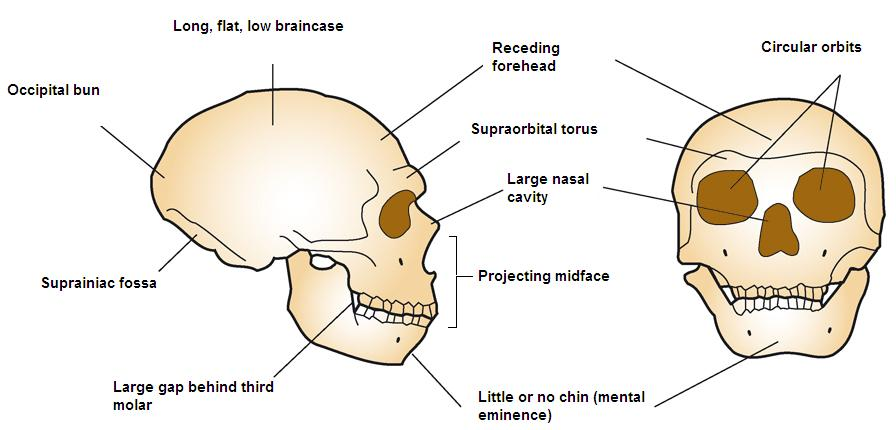
Neanderthal skull features

The Neanderthal skull is distinguished namely by a flat and broad skullcap, rounded supraorbital torus (the brow ridges), high orbits (eye sockets), a broad nose, mid-facial prognathism (the face projects far from the base of the skull), an "en bombe" (bomb-like) skull shape when viewed from the back, and an occipital bun at the back of the skull. The occipital bun, or "chignon", is within the range of variation for modern humans who have it. In Neanderthals, it is caused by the high and anterior (more forward) positions of the cranial base and temporal bones, in combination with a flatter skullcap.

==== Jaws ====
In Neanderthals, the zygomatic arches (cheekbones) are positioned in a rearward location relative to modern humans, while the maxilla (upper jaw) and nasal bones are positioned in a more forward direction. The front (anterior) teeth are characterised by their large size, strong and bulging tooth roots, and tooth wearing (especially on the lower front teeth). The upper incisors are shovel-shaped. There is a large retromolar space (gap behind the molars). Especially in Europe, Neanderthals had a high frequency of taurodontism, a condition where the molars are bulkier due to an enlarged pulp (tooth core). In modern populations the trait has an incidence rate of about 5%, but a weaker form of taurodontism (hypotaurodontism) is somewhat common in some European H. heidelbergensis populations, especially at the Sima de los Huesos site.

These observations are typically explained as a response to habitual heavy loading of the front teeth (anterior dental loading hypothesis), either to process mechanically challenging or attritive foods, or because they regularly used the mouth as a third hand. (Note: Neanderthals typically present a similar tooth wearing pattern to Greenland Inuit groups, who use their teeth to soften seal hide among other tasks.) The robusticity of the front teeth and the rest of the face has sometimes been ascribed to the production of a high bite force on the front teeth, but biomechanical studies have typically concluded that Neanderthals could produce similar or even smaller bite forces than modern humans.

==== Brain ====
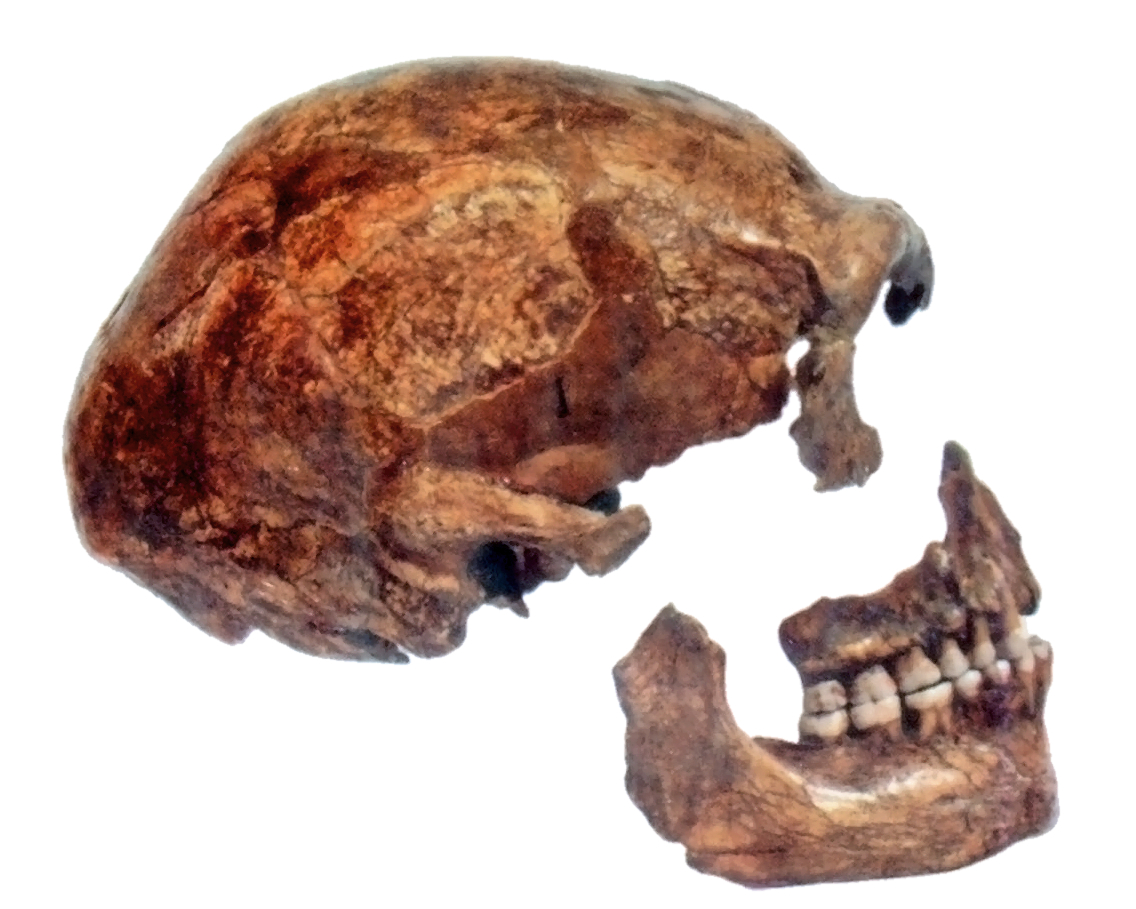
Neanderthal braincase and jaw from Spy Cave, Belgium

The Neanderthal braincase averages 1,640 cm^{3} (100 cu in) for males and 1,460 cm^{3} (89 cu in) for females, which is significantly larger than the averages for all groups of recent humans; for example, recent European males can average about 1,350 cm^{3} (82 cu in) and females 1,200 cm^{3} (73 cu in). Modern human brain size seems to have decreased since the Upper Palaeolithic, with a sample of 28 modern human specimens from 190,000 to 25,000 years ago averaging about 1,478 cm^{3} (90.2 cu in) disregarding sex. The largest Neanderthal brain, Amud 1, was calculated to be 1,736 cm^{3} (105.9 cu in), one of the largest ever recorded in humans. Both Neanderthal and modern human infants measure about 400 cm^{3} (24 cu in).

The Neanderthal brain had different growth and development rates than modern humans, especially in the orbitofrontal cortex (associated with decision making), parietal and temporal lobes (language processing and memory), and the cerebellum (motor functions). All of these regions are proportionally smaller in Neanderthals, and diverge in growth pattern at what would be a critical period in modern human neurological development. Altogether, such differences, while slight, may underlie the differences in Cro-Magnon and Neanderthal behaviour including sociality, technological innovation, and artistic output in the archaeological record.

=== Postcranium ===
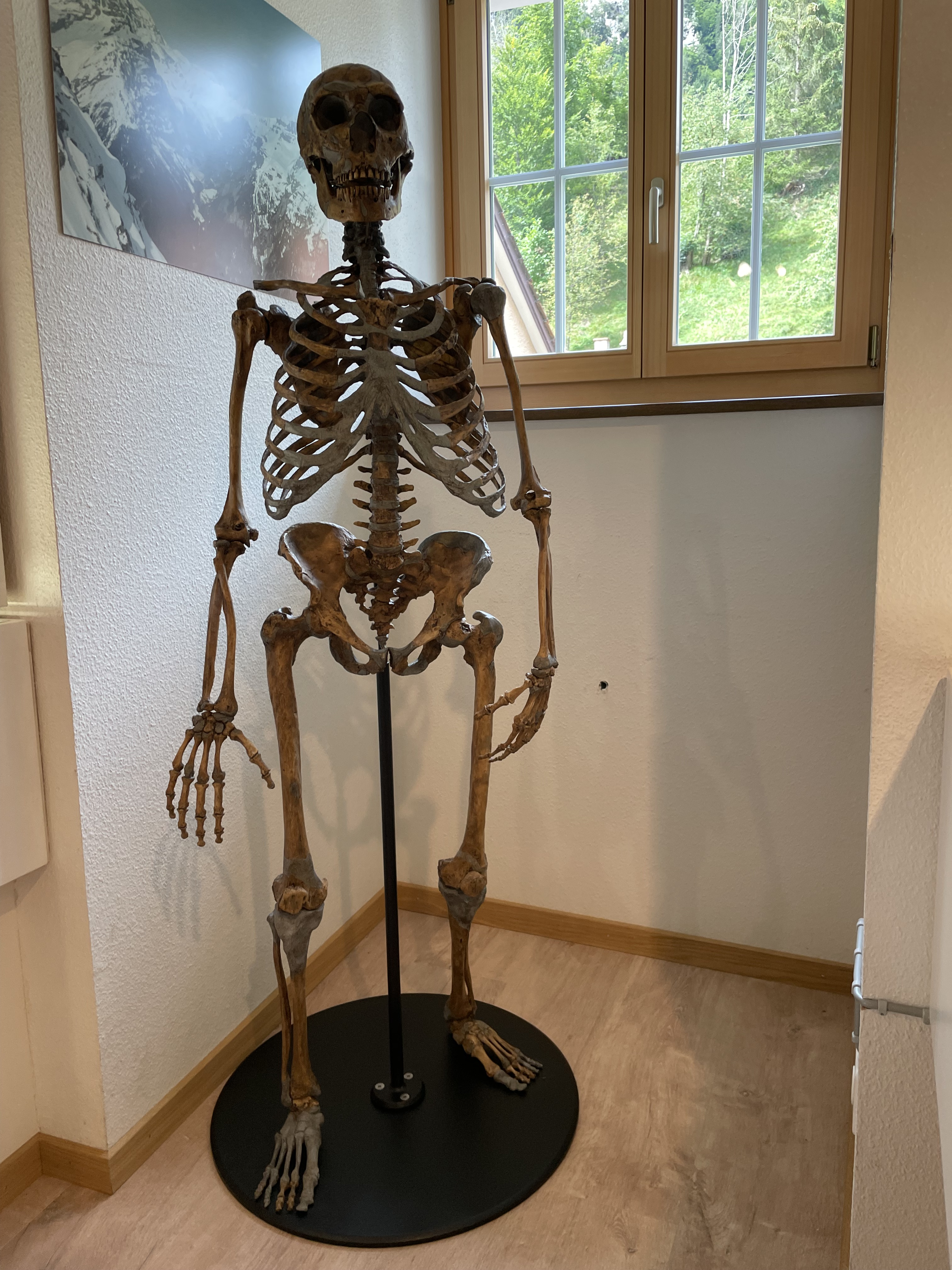
Neanderthal skeleton at the Drachenloch Museum

The neck vertebrae of Neanderthals are thicker from the front to the rear and transversely than those of (most) modern humans. This may have improved stability of the larger head.

The Neanderthal chest was deep and wide, with a proportionally expansive thoracic cavity, and possibly better lung performance. This was caused by longer, straighter ribs, and more dorsally (towards the head) orientated transverse processes on the vertebrae (where the rib connects to the spine). The latter caused the vertebrae to protrude farther into the ribcage (invagination). To support the wider lower thorax, the sacrum (where the pelvis connects to the spine) was more vertically inclined, and the pelvis was wider. This also caused the lumbar vertebrae (lower spine) to be less curved (hypolordosis, "flatback"), except for possibly the 5th lumbar vertebra. Though the skeleton of ancient Homo is poorly documented, because H. ergaster specimens over 1 million years old (namely Turkana Boy) seem to have had a similar physiology, it is possible a wide thorax is normal for Homo. The narrower thorax of modern humans may be a unique adaptation associated with the adoption of endurance running.

The limbs are proportionally short, which has traditionally been explained as a "hyper-arctic" adaptation (Allen's rule). A similar trend is also observed in modern Inuit and Siberian Yupik populations. Neanderthals in more temperate climates—such as Iberia—still retain the "hyperarctic" physique. The shorter limbs, combined with evidence of a stronger respiratory system and a faster metabolism fueling more fast-twitch muscle fibres, could altogether also be explained as adaptations for sprinting. Neanderthals were probably not as adept at endurance running as modern humans given the expanded thorax and long heel bones (causing a long moment arm at the Achilles' tendon, possibly more conducive for acceleration than distance).

Neanderthals had proportionately shorter thumbs and index fingers, but this does not seem to have negatively impacted dexterity. Bone trauma indicates Neanderthals habitually made use of a strong, squeezing grip. Like modern humans, Neanderthals seem to have exhibited handedness, generally preferring the right hand.

=== Size ===
In a sample of 45 Neanderthal long bones from 14 men and 7 women, the average height was 164 to 168 cm (5 ft 5 in to 5 ft 6 in) for males and 152 to 156 cm (5 ft 0 in to 5 ft 1 in) for females. The fossil record shows that adult Neanderthals varied from about 147.5 to 177 cm (4 ft 10 in to 5 ft 10 in) in height.

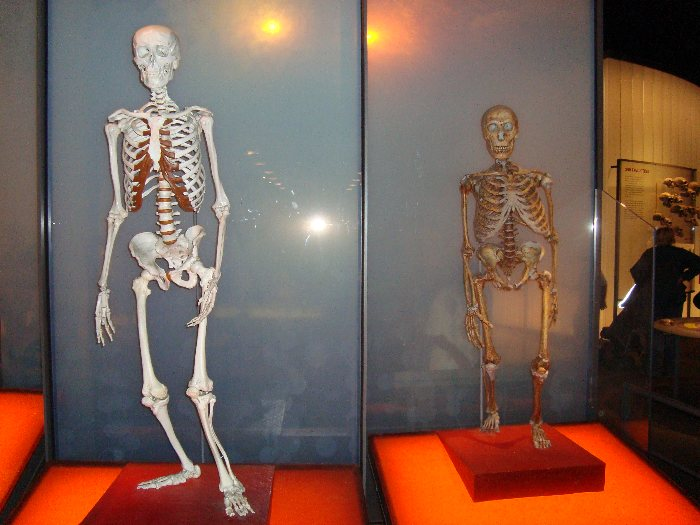
A modern human (left) and Neanderthal (right) skeleton at the American Museum of Natural History

For comparison, the average height of 20 male and 10 female Cro-Magnons is, respectively, 176.2 cm (5 ft 9 in) and 162.9 cm (5 ft 4 in), although this decreases by 10 cm (4 in) nearer the end of the Upper Palaeolithic based on 21 males and 15 females. The average height in the year 1900 was 163 cm (5 ft 4 in) and 152.7 cm (5 ft 0 in), respectively.

For Neanderthal weight, a sample of 26 specimens found an average of 77.6 kg (171 lb) for males and 66.4 kg (146 lb) for females. Using 76 kg (168 lb), the body mass index for Neanderthal males was calculated to be 26.9–28.3, which in modern humans correlates to being overweight. This indicates a very robust build. The Neanderthal LEPR gene concerned with storing fat and body heat production is similar to that of the woolly mammoth, and so was likely an adaptation for cold climate.

== Biology ==
=== Vision ===
The orbits (eye sockets) of Neanderthals, and possibly also the eyeballs, were bigger than those of Cro-Magnons and modern humans. It is unclear how this could relate to vision. In modern humans, eye socket size does not correlate with eyeball size; their volumes instead seem to be most influenced by the frontal lobe pushing into the area. In Neanderthals, the separation of the orbits from the frontal lobe is about midway what is seen in H. heidelbergensis and modern humans. Neurologically, Neanderthals had a proportionally large occipital lobe compared to Cro-Magnons, associated with visual processing. Genetically, colour blindness (which may enhance mesopic vision in low-light conditions) is typically correlated with high-latitude populations, and the Neanderthals from Vindija Cave, Croatia, had some substitutions in the Opsin genes which could have influenced colour vision.

The functional implications of these traits are inconclusive, but altogether, they could indicate a preference for activity in dimmer light conditions. This may have been advantageous in northerly latitudes where daylight hours are much shorter especially in winter, and low-light or nighttime hunting would enhance ambush tactics when pursuing large game. Neanderthal-derived alleles near ASB1 and EXOC6 are associated with being an evening person, narcolepsy and day-time napping.

=== Airways ===
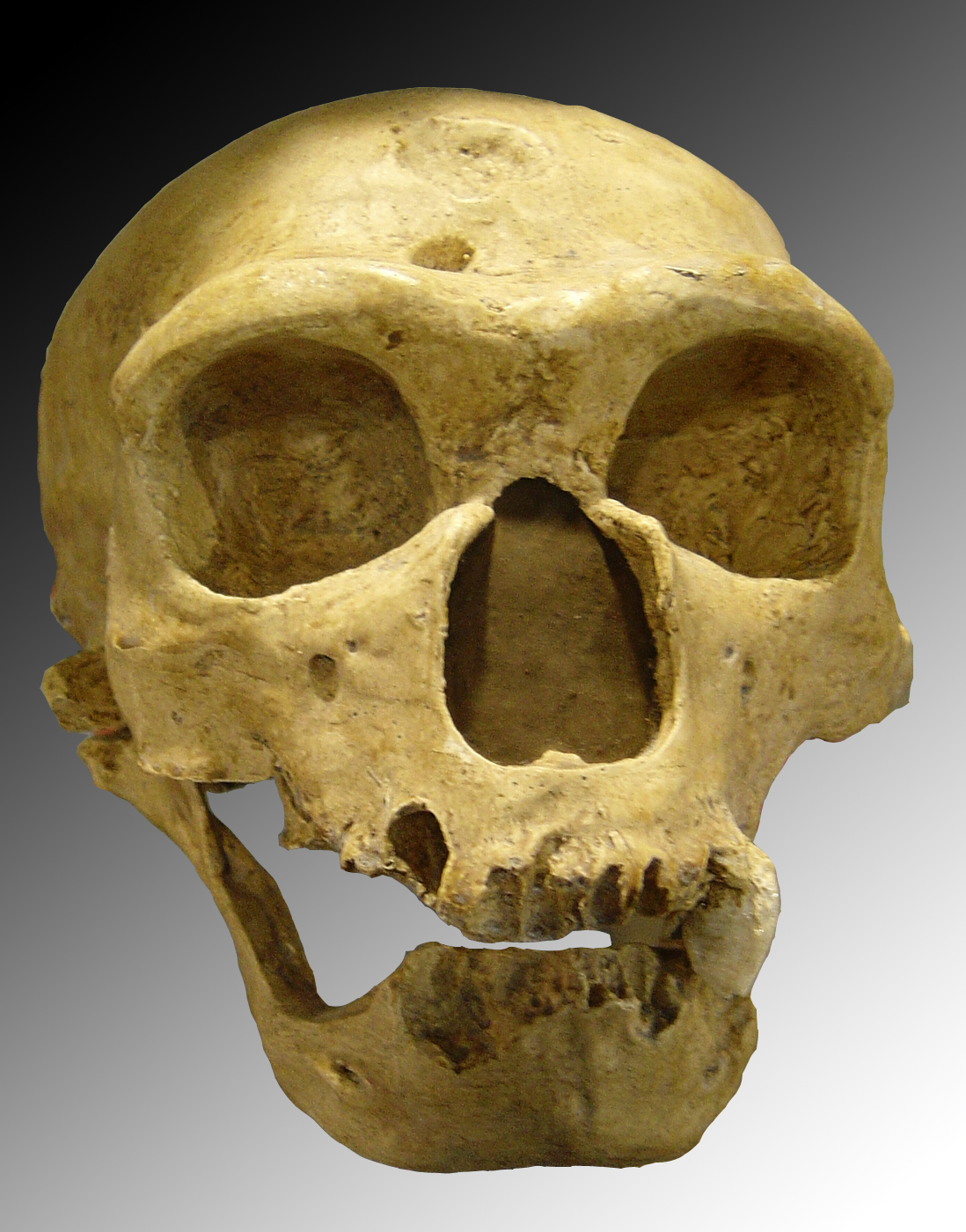
La Chapelle-aux-Saints 1 displaying a large piriform aperture (nose hole)

==== Breathing ====
The Neanderthal piriform aperture (nose hole) and nasal cavity are much wider and bigger than in modern humans. Assuming the nasal passages took up the entire nasal cavity, this has normally been explained as an adaptation to warm greater quantities of cold air to fuel their assumed heightened metabolism and activity levels compared to modern humans. A large nose does not necessarily equate to a better sense of smell. Neurologically, because the olfactory bulbs are smaller, Neanderthals may have had a poorer sense of smell and olfactory memory than modern humans.

In modern humans, high-latitude populations typically instead have taller, narrower piriform apertures and noses. These features decrease air intake per breath but improve turbulence within the nose to moisten and warm air. Since Neanderthals had a much longer skull and face, and consequently probably longer nasal passages, air may have been warmed enough after simply crossing such a distance to reach the lungs, not requiring the additional nasal turbulence.

The longer, straighter ribs and implied wider mid-lower thorax (where the ribcage is) similarly indicate stronger breathing in the lower thorax, a larger diaphragm, and possibly greater average lung capacity. The lung capacity of Kebara 2 was estimated to have been 9.04 L (2.39 US gal), compared to the average human capacity of 6 L (1.6 US gal) for males and 4.7 L (1.2 US gal) for females.

==== Vocalisation ====
In 1971, cognitive scientist Philip Lieberman attempted to reconstruct the Neanderthal vocal tract and concluded that it was similar to that of a modern human newborn. His reconstruction of the Neanderthal vocal tract left Neanderthals incapable of producing a range of speech sounds, due to the large size of the mouth and the small size of the pharyngeal cavity, thus no need for a descended larynx (Note: The lack of a descended larynx does not necessarily equate to a reduced vowel capacity.) to fit the entire tongue inside the mouth. He concluded that they were anatomically unable to produce the sounds /a/, /i/, /u/, /ɔ/, /g/, and /k/ and thus lacked the capacity for articulate speech, though were still able to speak at a level higher than non-human primates.

Lieberman's findings have subsequently been debated, especially in light of newer fossil discoveries and re-analyses. The 1983 discovery of a Neanderthal hyoid bone—used in speech production in humans—in Kebara 2 is almost identical to that of humans, which could suggest Neanderthals were capable of speech. Still, it is not possible to accurately reconstruct the entire vocal tract with just the hyoid. The Sima de los Huesos fossils, which may be a "pre-Neanderthal" population, also had humanlike hyoid and ear bones. Some studies can reconstruct the Neanderthal vocal apparatus as comparable to that of modern humans, but soft-tissue reconstructions are problematic in general.

=== Hair and skin colour ===
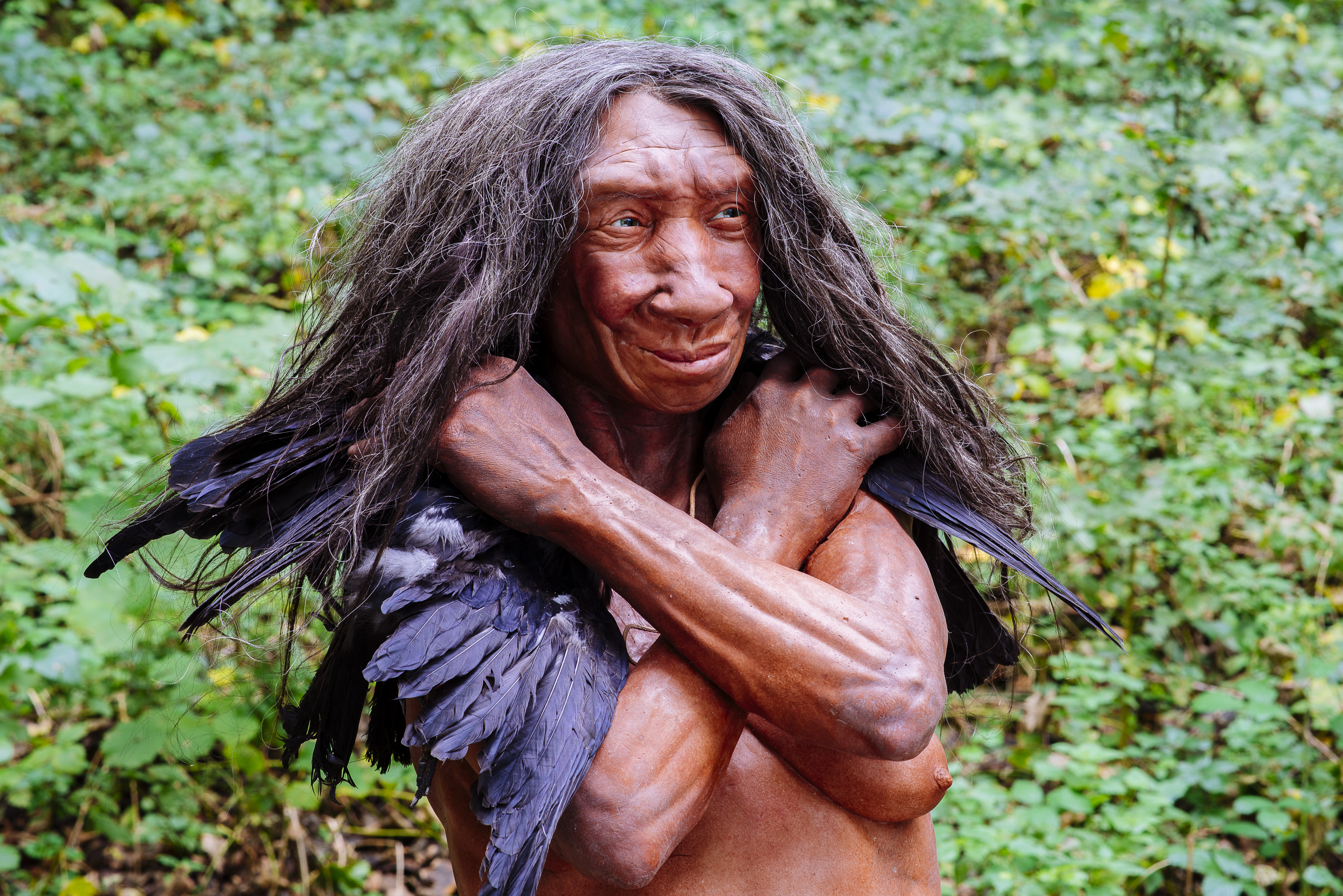
Reconstruction of a Neanderthal woman at the Neanderthal Museum created by the paleoartists Alfonse and Adrie Kennis.

The lack of sunlight may have led to the proliferation of lighter skin in Neanderthals. Genetically, Neanderthals could carry two different variations of BNC2, which in modern populations are associated with lighter or darker skin colour in the UK Biobank. DNA analysis of three Neanderthal females from southeastern Europe indicates that they had brown eyes and dark skin colour.

In modern humans, skin and hair colour is regulated by the melanocyte-stimulating hormone—which increases the proportion of eumelanin (black pigment) to phaeomelanin (red pigment)—which is encoded by the MC1R gene. There are five known variants in modern humans of the gene which cause loss-of-function and are associated with light skin and hair colour. None of the variants associated with red hair have been found in Neanderthals, but they carried an additional variant, R307G, which could be associated with pale skin and red hair. The R307G variant was identified in a Neanderthal from Monti Lessini, Italy, and possibly Cueva del Sidrón, Spain.

=== Metabolism ===
Generally, models on Neanderthal caloric requirements report significantly higher intakes than those of modern humans. They typically assume that Neanderthals had higher basal metabolic rates (BMRs) due to higher muscle mass, faster growth rate, and greater body heat production against the cold. Higher daily physical activity levels (PALs) are also usually assumed, caused by less efficient foraging techniques than Cro-Magnons, requiring Neanderthals to travel farther and expend more energy daily.

== Life history ==
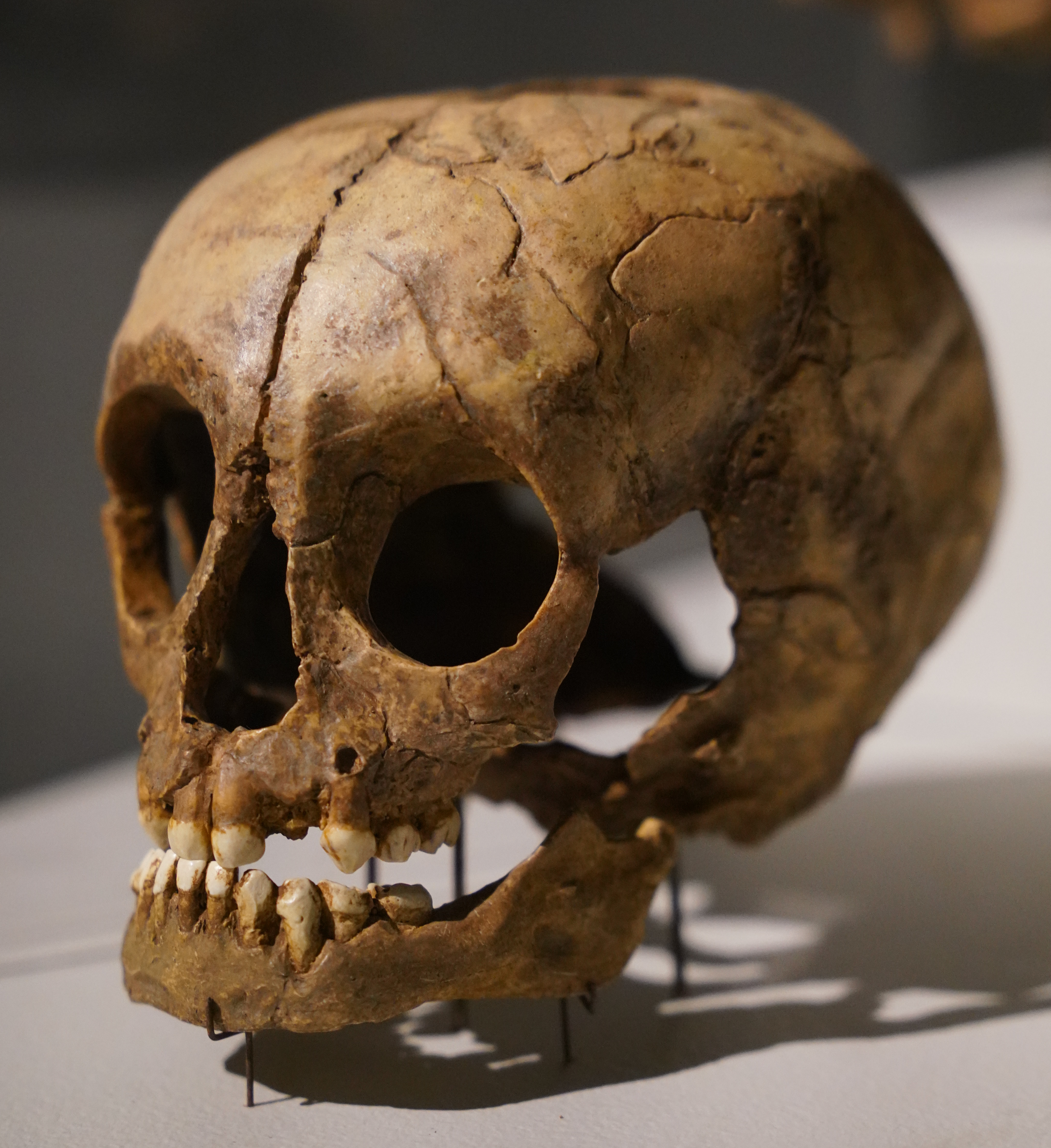
Neanderthal infant skull from Pech-de-l'Azé cave

Maximum natural lifespan and the timing of adulthood, menopause, and gestation were most likely similar to modern humans.

Based on the growth rates of teeth and tooth enamel, Neanderthals may have matured faster than modern humans. The enamel is thinner in Neanderthals, which may have stemmed from a lower long-period line periodicity and a faster extension rate, which resulted in faster tooth crown formation times. Skeletally, the main differences in maturation are the atlas bone in the neck as well as the middle thoracic vertebrae fused about 2 years later in Neanderthals than in modern humans, but this was more likely caused by a difference in anatomy rather than growth rate.

In a sample of 669 Neanderthal tooth crowns, 75% suffered some degree of enamel hypoplasia, an indicator of developmental stress perhaps caused by recurrent starvation at a young age while the teeth were forming. Comparing the rate to what is seen in recent Tikiġaġmiut, Neanderthals experienced stresses lasting from two weeks to up to three months.

== Pathology ==
=== Injuries ===
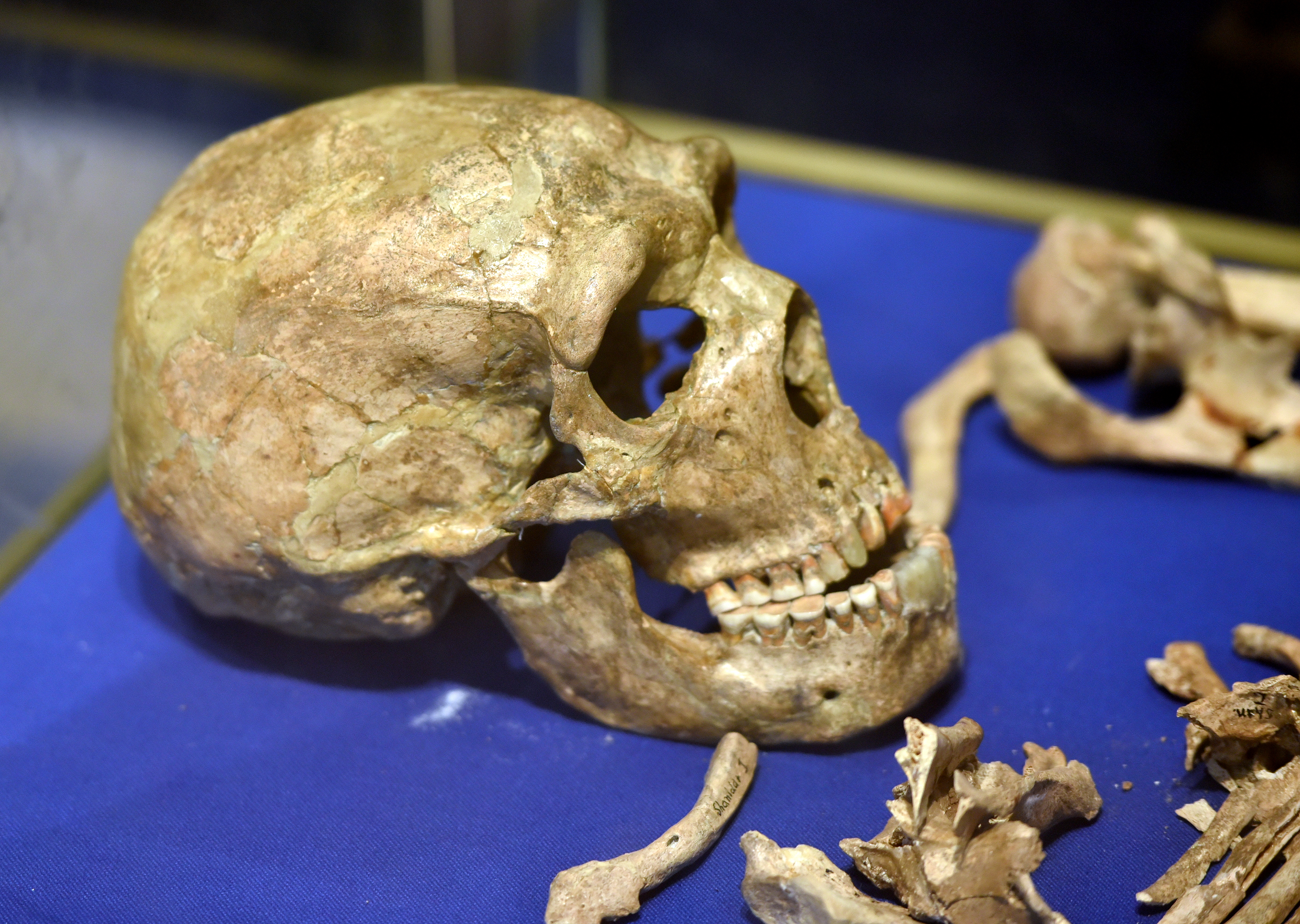
The skull of Shanidar I

Neanderthals suffered a high rate of traumatic injury, with an estimated 79–94% of specimens showing evidence of healed major trauma, of which 37–52% were severely injured, and 13–19% injured before reaching adulthood. One extreme example is Shanidar 1, who shows signs of an amputation of the right arm likely due to a nonunion after breaking a bone in adolescence, osteomyelitis (a bone infection) on the left clavicle, an abnormal gait, vision problems in the left eye, and possible hearing loss (perhaps swimmer's ear).

In 1995, Trinkaus estimated that about 80% succumbed to their injuries and died before reaching 40, and thus theorised that Neanderthals employed a risky hunting strategy ("rodeo rider" hypothesis). Compared to contemporary modern humans, the rates of cranial trauma are not significantly different (although Neanderthals seem to have had a higher mortality risk), there are few specimens of both Cro-Magnons and Neanderthals who died after the age of 40, and there are overall similar injury patterns between them. In 2012, Trinkaus concluded that Neanderthals may have additionally been injuring themselves in the same way as contemporary humans, such as by interpersonal violence.

A 2016 study looking at 124 Neanderthal specimens argued that high trauma rates were instead caused by animal attacks, and found that about 36% of the sample were victims of bear attacks, 21% big cat attacks, and 17% wolf attacks (totalling 92 positive cases, 74%). There were no cases of hyena attacks, although hyenas still nonetheless probably attacked Neanderthals, at least opportunistically. Such intense predation probably stemmed from common confrontations due to competition over food and cave space, and from Neanderthals hunting these carnivores.

=== Congenital defects ===
Low population caused a low genetic diversity and probably inbreeding, which reduced the population's ability to filter out harmful mutations (inbreeding depression). It is unknown how this affected a single Neanderthal's genetic burden and, thus, if this caused a higher rate of birth defects than in modern humans.

Some examples of Neanderthal congenital disorders include:

- The 13 inhabitants of Sidrón Cave collectively exhibited 17 different birth defects likely due to inbreeding or recessive disorders (Note: They exhibited: narrowing of the nasal cavity, retained deciduous canine, clefts of the atlas, hypoplasia of the axis, clefting of the twelfth thoracic vertebra, either a small thoracic rib or a lumbar rib, os centrale carpi and bipartite scaphoid bone, tripartite kneecap, abnormally-shaped tarsal bones, and cuboid-navicular coalition.)
- Likely due to advanced age (60s or 70s), La Chapelle-aux-Saints 1 had signs of Baastrup's disease, affecting the spine, and osteoarthritis
- Shanidar 1, who likely died at about 30 or 40, was diagnosed with the most ancient case of diffuse idiopathic skeletal hyperostosis (DISH), a degenerative disease which can restrict movement, which, if correct, would indicate a moderately high incidence rate for older Neanderthals

=== Diseases ===
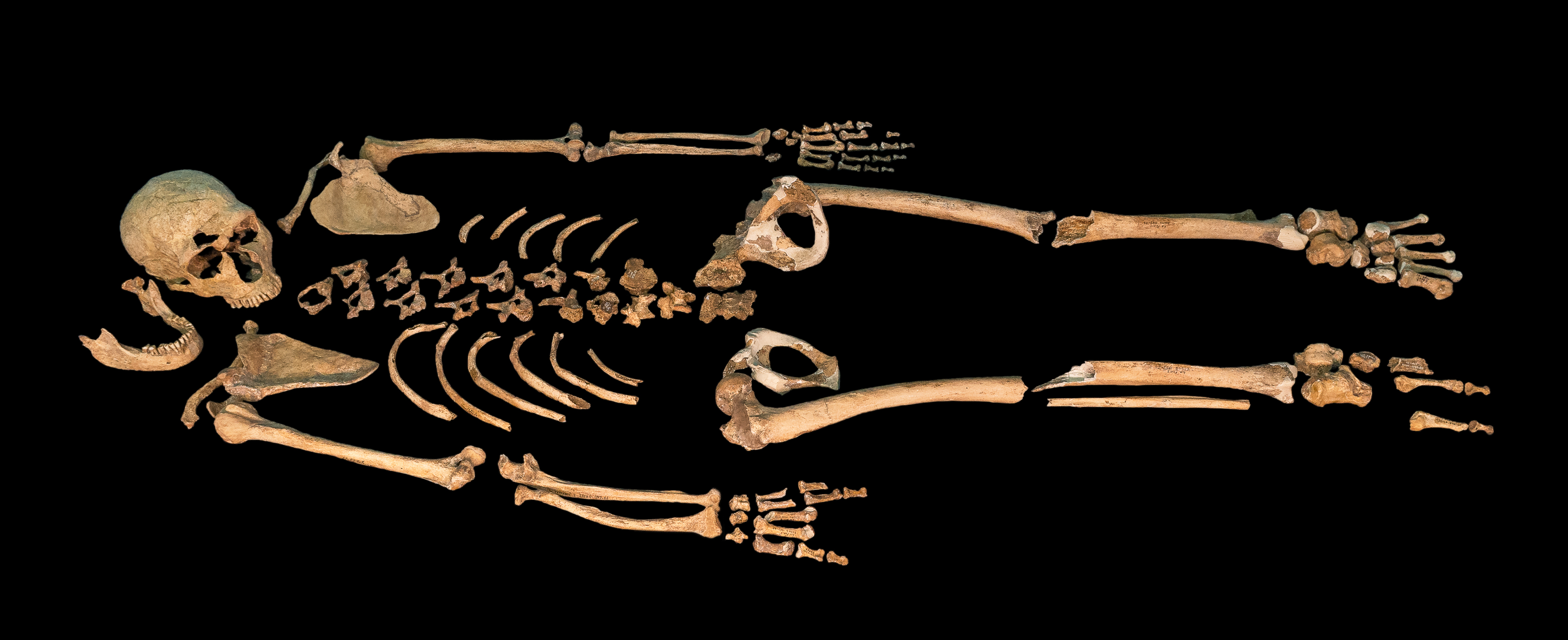
La Ferrassie 1 (above) may have had periostitis in his femora and tibiae.

Neanderthals were subject to several infectious diseases and parasites. Modern humans likely transmitted diseases to them; one possible candidate is the stomach bacteria Helicobacter pylori. The modern human papillomavirus variant 16A may descend from Neanderthal introgression. A Neanderthal at Cueva del Sidrón, Spain, shows evidence of a gastrointestinal Enterocytozoon bieneusi infection. The leg bones of the French La Ferrassie 1 feature lesions that are consistent with periostitis—inflammation of the tissue enveloping the bone—likely a result of hypertrophic osteoarthropathy, which is primarily caused by a chest infection or lung cancer. La Chapelle-aux-Saints 1 has lesions down the length of his spine consistent with brucellosis, probably infected with Brucella abortus while butchering a carcass or eating raw meat.

Neanderthals had a lower cavity rate than modern humans, despite some populations consuming typically cavity-causing foods in great quantity. This could indicate a lack of cavity-causing oral bacteria, namely Streptococcus mutans.

In Neanderthals, the Eustachian tubes (which connect the middle ear to the throat) are flat. In modern humans, as an infant grows, the Eustachian tubes become angled to improve drainage of the middle ear and prevent bacterial infection. The flatness of the Eustachian tubes throughout life may have made Neanderthals more prone to developing ear infections. A 2019 study found that 48% of their 77 Neanderthal skull sample size presented bony growths consistent with swimmer's ear (inflammation of the ear canal).

=== Poisoning ===
Two 250,000-year-old Neanderthaloid children from Payré, France, present the earliest known cases of lead exposure. They were exposed on two distinct occasions either by eating or drinking contaminated food or water, or inhaling lead-laced smoke from a fire. There are two lead mines within 25 km (16 mi) of the site.

== See also ==
- Human anatomy
- Human biology
- Neanderthal behavior
- Neanderthal genetics
