= Sheltered instruction =

English teaching method

Sheltered instruction is an educational approach designed to make academic content more accessible to English language learners (ELLs) while promoting their language development. It involves modifying instruction to accommodate students' language proficiency levels and providing additional support to help comprehend and engage with material effectively.

Originating in the field of bilingual education, sheltered instruction has gained prominence as schools worldwide strive to meet the needs of diverse student populations. The approach encompasses various strategies, including differentiated instruction, visual aids, cooperative learning, and explicit language instruction, tailored to the linguistic and academic needs of ELLs.

Central to sheltered instruction is the belief that all students, regardless of language background, deserve equitable access to rigorous academic content. By incorporating language support and scaffolding techniques into classroom instruction, educators aim to empower ELLs to succeed academically while fostering their language proficiency in English.

This article provides an overview of sheltered instruction, its principles, methods, and its impact on teaching and learning in multicultural educational settings.

== Origin of sheltered instruction ==
Stephen Krashen introduced the method in the early 1980s as a way to integrate second language acquisition techniques into teaching various subjects. This approach aims to present academic content, including its vocabulary, concepts, and skills, in a manner that is easily comprehensible by leveraging language and context.

In schools across the United States, the term "sheltered" is often used to refer to specialized courses tailored for English language learners, focusing on subjects such as mathematics, science, and social studies. The term "sheltered" signifies that this type of instruction offers a safe haven from the linguistic challenges of mainstream teaching, which may be too complex for English Language Learners (ELLs) to grasp. Sheltered instruction, also known as SDAIE (Specially Designed Academic Instruction in English) in certain areas, offers support to students through visual aids, adapted reading materials and tasks, and catering to their language-related requirements.

== Principles of sheltered instruction ==
The principles of sheltered instruction are:

1. Language Scaffolding: Teachers provide language support and scaffolding techniques to help ELLs understand and engage with academic content. This might involve using visuals, realia, simplified language, and context clues to aid comprehension.
2. Comprehensible Input: Instruction is delivered in a way that ELLs can understand, typically by using clear, simple language, and avoiding complex sentence structures and academic jargon. Teachers may also use gestures, demonstrations, and other non-verbal cues to support comprehension.
3. Cultural Sensitivity: Teachers respect and value the cultural backgrounds and experiences of ELLs, integrating culturally relevant content and examples into instruction. This helps ELLs feel more connected to the material and promotes a positive learning environment.
4. Active Engagement: ELLs are actively engaged in the learning process through hands-on activities, group work, discussions, and other interactive learning experiences. This promotes language development and helps ELLs make connections between new concepts and their own experiences.
5. Differentiated Instruction: Instruction is differentiated to meet the diverse needs of ELLs, taking into account their varying levels of English proficiency, academic readiness, and learning styles. Teachers may provide additional support or modify assignments as needed to ensure all ELLs can access the curriculum.
6. Explicit Language Instruction: Teachers explicitly teach language skills such as vocabulary, grammar, and language functions within the context of academic content. This helps ELLs develop the language skills they need to participate fully in classroom activities and academic discussions.
7. Assessment for Learning: Assessment practices are used to monitor ELLs' progress, identify areas of need, and adjust instruction accordingly. Teachers may use a variety of formative assessment techniques, such as observation, questioning, and performance tasks, to gather information about ELLs' language development and academic achievement.

By following these principles, educators can create a supportive learning environment where ELLs can thrive academically while developing their English language proficiency.

== Methods of sheltered instruction ==
Sheltered instruction employs various methods to support English language learners (ELLs) in comprehending content while developing language skills simultaneously. One effective approach involves the use of visual aids, such as charts, diagrams, and multimedia resources, to enhance understanding and make abstract concepts more tangible. Additionally, language scaffolding plays a crucial role, as teachers break down complex language into more manageable components, providing support as students build proficiency. Realia and manipulatives further facilitate comprehension by utilizing tangible objects and hands-on materials to illustrate concepts in a concrete manner.

Explicit instruction is another cornerstone of sheltered instruction, with teachers clearly articulating learning objectives, providing step-by-step explanations, and offering multiple examples to reinforce understanding. Graphic organizers serve as valuable tools for organizing information visually, helping students grasp complex concepts more easily. Moreover, contextualized learning strategies involve connecting new information to students' prior knowledge, experiences, and cultural backgrounds, thereby making learning more relevant and meaningful.

Collaborative learning environments promote language development by encouraging students to work together in pairs or groups, engaging in problem-solving activities, discussions, and role-plays. Language development activities, such as debates and discussions, provide structured opportunities for language practice within a supportive context. Modified texts tailored to students' language proficiency levels ensure accessibility without compromising academic rigor. Finally, regular feedback and assessment practices consider both language development and content mastery, allowing teachers to provide targeted support and adjustments as needed. By employing these diverse methods, sheltered instruction enables ELLs to thrive academically while acquiring English language proficiency.

== Sheltered instruction's impact on teaching and learning in multicultural educational settings ==
Sheltered instruction is important for helping students from different cultural backgrounds learn together. It focuses on supporting students who are learning English by using special teaching methods. These methods make lessons easier to understand and help students improve their English skills while still learning the same material as everyone else.

Teachers who use sheltered instruction adapt their teaching to meet the needs of English language learners. They make sure that all students can understand the lessons by using clear language and building on what students already know. This makes sure that everyone has a fair chance to learn and participate in class activities.

Sheltered instruction also helps students feel like they belong in the classroom. By including their cultural backgrounds and encouraging teamwork, teachers create a welcoming environment where everyone's contributions are valued.

Through sheltered instruction, students also learn to appreciate and understand different cultures. By sharing their experiences and working together on projects, they gain respect and empathy for each other's backgrounds, making the learning experience richer for everyone.

Finally, sheltered instruction helps English language learners improve their language skills in all subjects. Teachers focus on teaching important language skills while teaching regular lessons, helping students succeed not just in school, but in life beyond the classroom.

Overall, sheltered instruction makes classrooms more inclusive and helps all students succeed, no matter where they come from or what language they speak. It's about celebrating diversity and giving every student the chance to do their best.

== Implementation challenges ==
Studies of Sheltered Instruction show students make significant gains in academic achievement when the model is implemented with fidelity, which requires support and time for teachers to learn the instructional techniques associated with the model. When two ELL cohorts taught by teachers who were and were not trained in Sheltered Instruction were compared, students of the trained teachers made significantly greater long-term improvements in writing. In another study focused on student achievement in an array of subject areas, 30% teachers trained in Sheltered Instruction and 83% of the untrained teachers were not implementing most of the features of Sheltered Instruction at the end of the second year.

See also

- Content and language integrated learning (CLIL)
- Comprehensible input (See: Stephen Krashen)
- Competition model
