= Marcellin Boule =

French palaeontologist, geologist, and anthropologist (1861–1942)

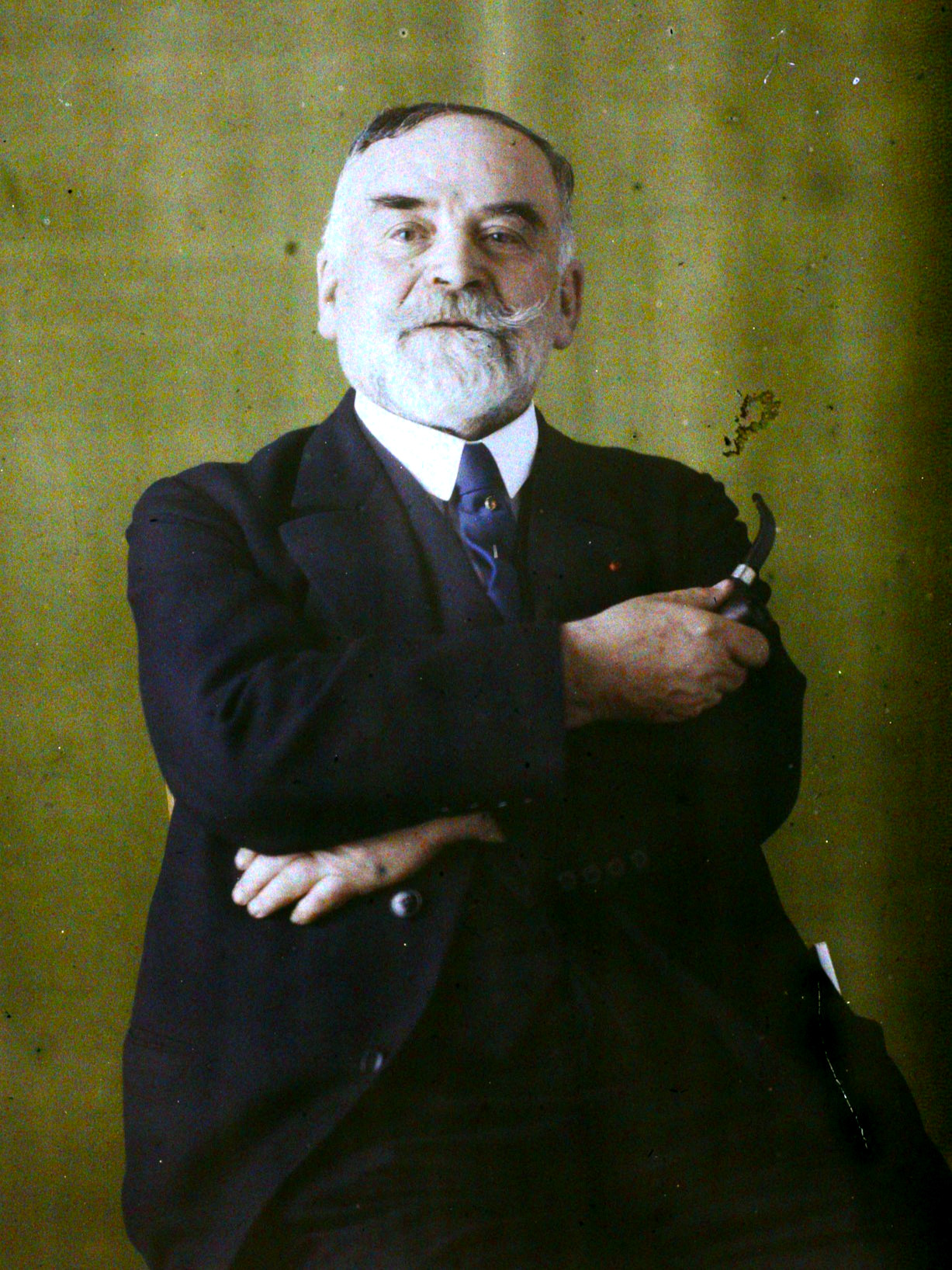
- 1929 Autochrome by Georges Chevalier
- Born: 1 January 1861; Montsalvy, Second French Empire
- Died: 4 July 1942 (aged 81); Montsalvy, Vichy France
- Known for: La Chapelle-aux-Saints 1 Neanderthal anatomy
- Awards: Wollaston Medal (1933)
- Scientific career
- Fields: Palaeontology, Geology, Anthropology

Pierre-Marcellin Boule (French pronunciation: [pjɛʁ maʁsəlɛ̃ bul]; 1 January 1861 – 4 July 1942), better known as merely Marcellin Boule, was a French palaeontologist, geologist, and anthropologist.

== Early life and education ==
Pierre-Marcellin Boule was born in Montsalvy, France.

== Career ==
Boule was a professor at the Muséum National d’Histoire Naturelle, Paris (1902–1936) and "for many years director of the Institut de Paléontologie Humaine, Paris." He was an editor (1893–1940) of the journal L’Anthropologie and was the founder of two other scientific journals.

Boule studied and published in 1911 the first analysis of a complete Neanderthal specimen. The fossil discovered in La Chapelle-aux-Saints was an old man, and Boule characterized it as brutish, bent-kneed and not a fully erect biped. In an illustration Boule commissioned, the Neanderthal was characterized as a hairy gorilla-like figure with opposable toes, according to a skeleton which was already distorted with arthritis. As a result, Neanderthals were viewed in subsequent decades as being highly primitive creatures with no direct relation to anatomically modern humans. Later re-evaluations of the La Chapelle-aux-Saints skeleton have roundly discredited Boule's initial work on the specimen.

He was one of the first to argue that eoliths were not human made.

Boule also expressed some skepticism about the Piltdown Man discovery — later revealed to be a hoax. As early as 1915, Boule recognized that the jaw belonged to an ape rather than an ancient human. However, the Piltdown forgery has been characterized as providing evidential support for Boule's "branching evolution" conclusions drawn from his Neanderthal research — research which is likewise said to have "prepar[ed] the international community for the appearance of a non-Neanderthal fossil such as Piltdown Man."

== Personal life and demise ==
Boule died at age 81 in Montsalvy in France, the same town where he was born.

== References and sources ==
- Groenen, Marc (1994). Millon, J. (ed.). Pour une histoire de la préhistoire (in French). Editions Jérôme Millon. ISBN 2-905614-93-5.
