= SIOP =

SIOP may refer to:

- International Society of Paediatric Oncology
- Sales Inventory Operations Planning, an integrated business management process
- Sheltered Instruction Observation Protocol, a research-based observation instrument used to measure sheltered instruction
- Single Integrated Operational Plan, the tactical blueprint for the deployment of nuclear weapons by the United States
- Society for Industrial and Organizational Psychology, a division of the American Psychological Association for I/O psychologists
- Steroid-induced osteoporosis, a bone disease that leads to an increased risk of fracture
