= Specially designed academic instruction in English =

Specially designed academic instruction in English (SDAIE) is a teaching approach intended for teaching various academic content (such as social studies, science or literature) using the English language to students who are still learning English. SDAIE requires the student possess intermediate fluency in English as well as mastery of their native language. The instruction is carefully prepared so the student can access the English language content supported by material in their primary language and carefully planned instruction that strives for comprehensible input. SDAIE is a method of teaching students in English in such a manner that they gain skills in both the subject material and in using English.

SDAIE is not an English-only submersion program where the student is dependent solely on English, nor is it a watered down curriculum. SDAIE is an approach that seeks to teach both content and language in a cognitively demanding environment. As such, it is an important aspect of some structured English immersion programs. Lessons thus include both content goals and language goals for the students.

Preparing good lessons in SDAIE require awareness that the student is not a native English speaker and avoidance of those aspects of English that might make it difficult for a person learning English as a second language. This includes avoiding idiomatic English, which may seem natural to a native speaker but would confuse non-native speakers.

== Features of SDAIE ==
Low affective filter

- Error correction done in context through teacher modeling
- New teaching material introduced and presented by the teacher in a way that engages the student.

Modified speech

- slower speech rate
- clear enunciation
- controlled vocabulary
- use of cognates
- limited use of idiomatic speech
- words with double meaning defined

Contextual clues

- gestures and facial expressions
- meaning acted out
- color-coded materials/ graphic organizers

Multisensory experiences

- realia, props and manipulatives
- audio-visual materials
- hands on activities and demonstrations
- overhead transparencies and similar projection technologies

Comprehensible input

- graphic organizers (maps, charts, graphs)
- word banks with picture clue
- bulletin boards
- explanation of word origins (etymology)
- use of examples and analogies

Frequent Comprehension checks

- questions asked about details
- eliciting responses through various modalities (write on white boards, thumbs up/down, etc.)

Formative assessment

- confirmation checks
- clarification requests
- repetitions
- expansions
- variety of question types
- interaction: teacher: student student:teacher student: student group

Summative assessment

- mastery assessed using a variety of modalities
- review of main topics and key vocabulary
- resulting product shows mastery of key concepts and synthesis of information
- written assessment appropriate for intermediate/ early advanced English language learners

Appropriate lesson design

- student fluency level is reflected
- evidence of scaffolding
- listening and speaking activities precede reading and writing activities
- reading assignments include prereading, during reading, postreading activities
- writing activities preceded by pre-writing
- vocabulary emphasis
- use of cooperative learning groups
- tapping prior knowledge/ personal application
- appropriate pacing
- modeling of activities
- specific learning strategies or study skills are taught and modeled
- evidence of text adaptation
- emphasis on higher order critical thinking skills
- provision of native language support
- extension/ debriefing activity included

Content-driven

- rigorous core curriculum (not 'watered down')
- key topics organized around main themes
- topics appropriate to grade level

== Relevant articles ==
- Genzuk, M. (2011). Specially Designed Academic Instruction in English (SDAIE) for Language Minority Students
- Education
- Teaching English as a Foreign Language
