= Realia =

Realia may refer to:

- Realia (education), objects from real life used in classroom instruction
- Realia (library science), three-dimensional objects from real life that do not easily fit into the traditional categories of library material
- Realia, a disused name for a genus of molluscs, Liarea
- Realia (translation), words and expressions for culture-specific material things
