= Disciplinary literacy =

In the United States, disciplinary literacy is the teaching of literacy within the defined disciplines of mathematics, science, English-language arts, and social studies. This process is defined as "the use of reading, rereading, investigating, speaking, and writing required to learn and form complex content knowledge appropriate to a particular discipline". Through the practices of disciplinary literacy, educators are to present content using real-world examples and connections, and do so in such a way as to accurately incorporate and exemplify the everyday lives of all students, regardless of race, gender, socioeconomic status, etc. As such, students are coached to become experts in each disciplinary field; that is, students are encouraged and expected to acquire and use skills, during reading, that professionals in each of the disciplines themselves are using. To note, disciplinary literacy does not demand reading skills be taught during instruction of various content areas, there is still some crossover, with the need to incorporate some reading skills, such as vocabulary instruction.

Disciplinary literacy is the result of the inception of the Common Core State Standards, Next Generation Science Standards, and 3C Framework for Social Studies. These standards promote the reading and writing of complex texts within the various disciplines.

== Common misconception ==
The expression, "every teacher is a teacher of reading" is a commonly used phrase in the field of education; however, researchers are encouraging professionals to depart from this ideological practice. To clarify, disciplinary literacy is not the incorporation of reading-specific skills, such as, but not limited to, phonological instruction, phonemic awareness, etc., into non-reading classrooms, and, while teachers are often encouraged to serve as reading teachers, regardless of the discipline in which they teach, it is argued that this approach is ineffective. Educators, instead, practice fusing literacy and content instruction.

== Inconsistencies in the practice ==
Educators are expected to incorporate socially just content with the intellectual aspect of teaching content. While its focus is on the inclusion of morals into the classroom, socially just content encompasses a multitude of lenses. In teaching socially just content, educators acquire culturally responsive curricula, understand and embrace the differing perspectives of the individuals in the classroom, make content valuable, and ensure learners understand the value in the content, all while maintaining the required learning targets. Educators face difficulty completing each of the aforementioned tasks, which negate or dismiss required content.

In education there is an ambiguity surrounding who gets to determine what is proper or just teaching. With the lack of clarity, teachers make these determinations independently, on a daily basis. With the uncertainty, teachers are left to the devices of hope and supposition, rather than what is actual truth. This in mind, coupled with the pressure to complete all content within their particular discipline, leaves teachers struggling to incorporate culturally responsive teaching into the classroom, one element of disciplinary literacy in practice.

With respect to disciplinary literacy, there are some discrepancies in teacher training. Professional development often consists of front loading all pertinent information, and put it to practice immediately, with the expectation to yield positive results instantaneously. Instead, disciplinary literacy training is an ongoing process that requires an undefined time frame. Teachers receive little-to-no professional development on the matter. With this, educators feel underprepared when incorporating these practices into their classrooms.

== Application ==
Disciplinary literacy practices can be found in math, science, English-language arts, and social studies courses at the middle school, secondary, and post-secondary education levels. Each content area develops its own set of techniques for teaching content within the classroom, which can then be used in conjunction with other content areas. Some of these practices can be reviewed in the upcoming text. Note that the practices specified below serve only to provide context for disciplinary literacy in practice, and are, by no means, an instructional guidebook.

Within a social studies classroom, teachers are expected to incorporate the four dimensions of Inquiry Arc. To do so, teachers have created and administered lessons in which they incorporate local artifacts and primary sources into their curriculum to teach the desired content. Teachers will contextualize these artifacts to make connections to global occurrences to increase student knowledge of the mandated Social Studies content.

In an English Language Arts classroom, teachers have been noted to refer to the administered content as "art". The notion of English Language Arts as an art form used to inform students of the "art of language". Methods that promote this include, but are not limited to close reading, in which students are expected to read and reread a text, accompanied by annotations to identify the full meaning of the text.

Science classes foster literacy through the incorporation of vocabulary and classification skills in practice. To assist in understanding science content, educators teach the meanings and uses of prefixes and suffixes. The Frayer Model uses a graphic organiser technique to explore the meaning and use of an unfamiliar word before and during its context-specific sense in a text. Furthermore, science educators administer hands-on activities and laboratory experiments to encourage inquiry, fusing literacy skills through the recording of data during and after these activities.

== Approaches to teacher training ==
Initially, it was noted that training would focus on the blending of content and literacy practices, however, it was also noted that, while this is one element to professional development, teachers learning to successfully work with and learn from each other is another. Within this practice, professional learning communities would dictate one teacher leader who would facilitate collaboration amongst teachers to support best literacy practices within the disciplines, both independently and in conjunction with one another.

Professional development surrounding disciplinary literacy is a multi-step process rather than an intensive institute. This process begins and ends with assessment, with professional development at its center. Learning communities begin with a needs-assessment, in which a Content Area Literacy Survey is administered to determine the needs of teachers and students. Facilitators then begin to train teachers, using various methods, including, but not limited to, vocabulary instructional techniques in various content areas, etc., in which teachers will discourse and implement, should they so choose. Dates are then determined throughout the school year in which these trainings sessions will resume, and take place on an ongoing basis. These sessions will also serve as an assessment tool, in which teachers are interviewed, focus groups and classroom observations commenced, and reflective writings ensued, to determine the shift in teacher mindset and practice over time.
