= Content-based instruction =

Steps of using content based instruction for second language learners

Content-based instruction (CBI) is a significant approach in language education (Brinton, Snow, & Wesche, 1989), designed to provide second-language learners instruction in content and language (hence it is also called content-based language teaching; CBLT). CBI is considered an empowering approach which encourages learners to learn a language by using it as a real means of communication from the first day in class. The idea is to make them become independent learners so they can continue the learning process even outside the class.

Historically, the word content has changed its meaning in second language teaching. Content used to refer to the methods of grammar-translation, audio-lingual methodology, and vocabulary or sound patterns in dialog form.

Recently, content is interpreted as the use of subject matter as a vehicle for second or foreign language teaching/learning (linguistic immersion).

== Methodology ==
CBI is considered to be more of a philosophy or an approach than a methodology. There is no single formula for this type of instruction but there are certain models of CBI which are used worldwide to achieve a holistic and global approach to foreign language learning. In essence, CBI implies integration of language learning and content learning. Hence, in a CBI course the focus of learning is not on learning of a language in isolation, but rather learning of language through the study of subject matter. A CBI curriculum is based on a subject matter core, uses authentic language and texts, and is guided by learner needs. This means that the curriculum is based on a certain subject matter and communicative competence is acquired in the context of learning about certain topics in that subject area. This falls under the top down approach to language learning where, unlike the bottom up approach, a learner first learns the overall meaning of a text and then attends to the language features.

== Benefits ==
1. Learners are exposed to a considerable amount of language through stimulating content. Learners explore interesting content and are engaged in appropriate language-dependent activities. Languages are not learned through direct instruction, but rather acquired "naturally" or automatically.
2. CBI supports contextualized learning; learners are taught useful language that is embedded within relevant discourse contexts rather than presented as isolated language fragments. Hence students make greater connections with the language and what they already know.
3. Complex information is delivered through real life contexts for the students to grasp easily, thereby leading to intrinsic motivation.
4. In CBI information is reiterated by strategically delivering information at the right time and through situations compelling the students to learn out of passion.
5. Greater flexibility and adaptability in the curriculum can be deployed as per the student's interest.

== Comparison to other approaches ==
The CBI approach is comparable to English for Specific Purposes (ESP), which usually is for vocational or occupational needs, or to English for Academic Purposes (EAP). The goal of CBI is to prepare students to acquire the language while using the context of any subject matter so that students learn the language by using it within that specific context. Rather than learning a language out of context, it is learned within the context of a specific academic subject.

As educators realized that in order to successfully complete an academic task, second language (L2) learners have to master both English as a language form (grammar, vocabulary etc.) and how English is used in core content classes, they started to implement various approaches such as Sheltered instruction and learning to learn in CBI classes. Sheltered instruction is more of a teacher-driven approach that puts the responsibility on the teachers' shoulders. This is the case by stressing several pedagogical needs to help learners achieve their goals, such as teachers having knowledge of the subject matter, knowledge of instructional strategies to comprehensible and accessible content, knowledge of L2 learning processes and the ability to assess cognitive, linguistic and social strategies that students use to assure content comprehension while promoting English academic development. Learning to learn is more of a student-centered approach that stresses the importance of having the learners share this responsibility with their teachers. Learning to learn emphasizes the significant role that learning strategies play in the process of learning.

== Motivating students ==
Keeping students motivated and interested are two important factors underlying content-based instruction. Motivation and interest are crucial in supporting student success with challenging, informative activities that support success and which help the student learn complex skills (Grabe & Stoller, 1997). When students are motivated and interested in the material they are learning, they make greater connections between topics, elaborations with learning material and can recall information better (Alexander, Kulikowich, & Jetton, 1994: Krapp, Hidi, & Renninger, 1992). In short, when a student is intrinsically motivated the student achieves more. This in turn leads to a perception of success, of gaining positive attributes which will continue a circular learning pattern of success and interest. Krapp, Hidi and Renninger (1992) state that, "situational interest, triggered by environmental factors, may evoke or contribute to the development of long-lasting individual interests" (p. 18). Because CBI is student centered, one of its goals is to keep students interested and motivation high by generating stimulating content instruction and materials.

== Active student involvement ==
Because it falls under the more general rubric of communicative language teaching (CLT), the CBI classroom is learner- rather than teacher-centered (Littlewood, 1981). In such classrooms, students learn through doing and are actively engaged in the learning process. They do not depend on the teacher to direct all learning or to be the source of all information. Central to CBI is the belief that learning occurs not only through exposure to the teacher's input, but also through peer input and interactions. Accordingly, students assume active, social roles in the classroom that involve interactive learning, negotiation, information gathering and the co-construction of meaning (Lee and VanPatten, 1995). William Glasser's "control theory" exemplifies his attempts to empower students and give them voice by focusing on their basic, human needs: Unless students are given power, they may exert what little power they have to thwart learning and achievement through inappropriate behavior and mediocrity. Thus, it is important for teachers to give students voice, especially in the current educational climate, which is dominated by standardization and testing (Simmons and Page, 2010).

== Conclusion ==
The integration of language and content teaching is perceived by the European Commission as "an excellent way of making progress in a foreign language." CBI effectively increases learners' English language proficiency and teaches them the skills necessary for the success in various professions. With CBI, learners gradually acquire greater control of the English language, enabling them to participate more fully in an increasingly complex academic & social environment.

== See also ==
- Content and language integrated learning
- English language learning and teaching
- Language education
- Second language
- Teaching English as a foreign language
