= Olfactory heritage =

Aspect of cultural heritage

Olfactory heritage is an aspect of cultural heritage concerning smells that are meaningful to a community due to their connections with significant places, practices, objects or traditions, and can therefore be considered part of the cultural legacy for future generations.

Research in olfactory heritage involves and interacts with many disciplines such as history, heritage science, chemistry, archaeology, anthropology, art history, sensory science, olfactory museology and sensory geography.

== Documentation of olfactory heritage ==
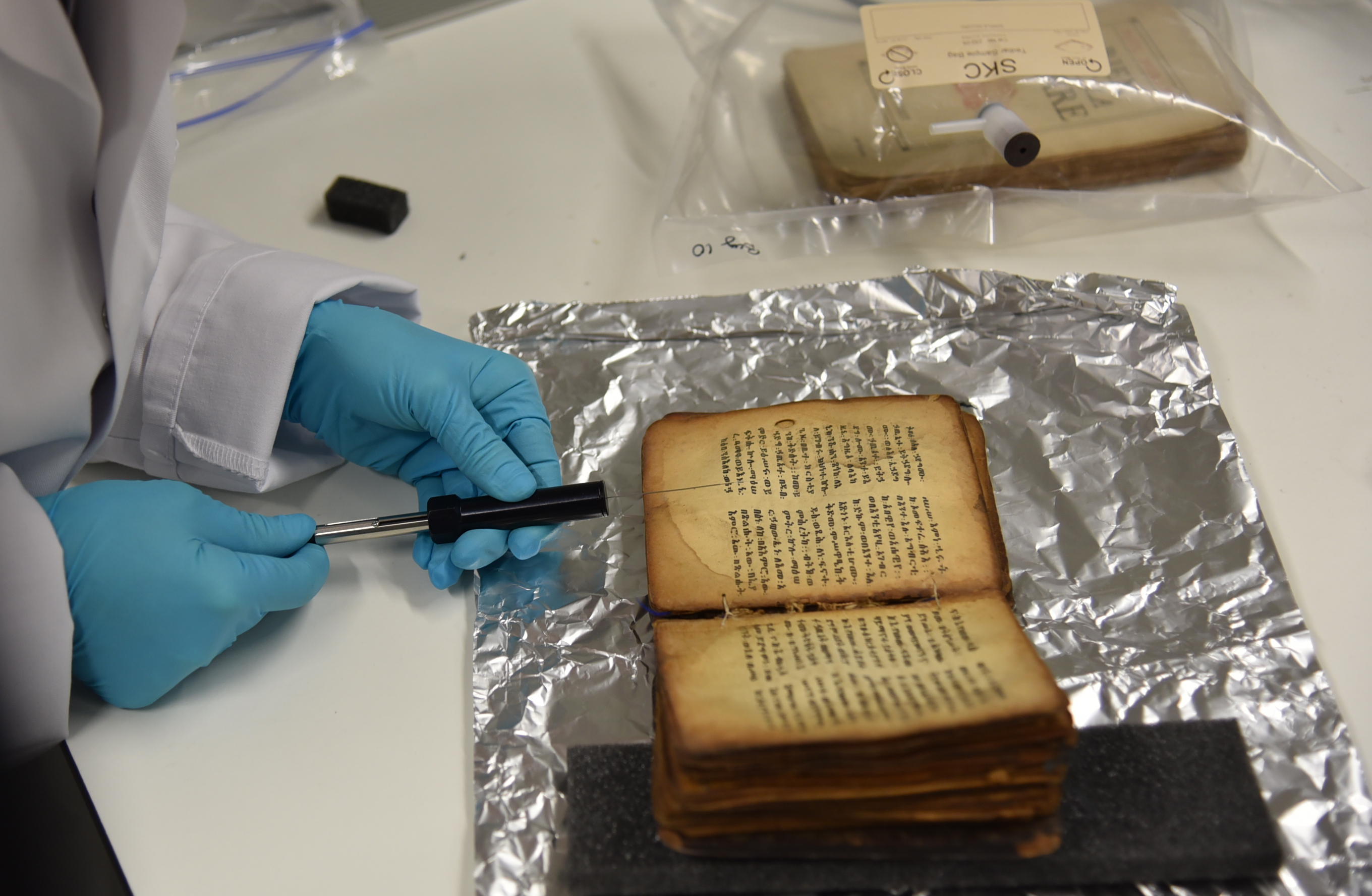
Researcher sampling the volatile organic compounds of a historic book using solid phase microextraction at the Heritage Science Lab in University College London Institute for Sustainable Heritage.

Olfactory heritage science is an emerging field of research, focused on the scientific techniques to analyse, document and preserve odours and the perspectives to understand their relevance.

Due to the intangible and ephemeral nature of odours, one of the main challenges of olfactory heritage science is developing methodologies for documenting and archiving the smells for the future. Several techniques are currently used, such as smellmapping, combined methodology of ethnographic methods, tracing sensory references in historic accounts and odour wheels displaying chemical and sensory characterisation. In addition, a framework for the systematic study of olfactory heritage was proposed in 2017, aiming to document both the chemical properties and the human perception of smells of cultural importance.

== Preservation of olfactory heritage ==
In addition to documenting contemporary smells that will be future heritage, an aspect of olfactory heritage involves scent preservation, often focusing on the smells of the past.

== Protection of olfactory heritage ==
There are currently no international guidelines for the protection of olfactory heritage. In heritage guidelines, 'the smells and sounds associated with the place and its use' are understood to contribute to cultural significance and should be considered when defining the character of a historic area because they affect our experience of places. In this sense, the smells of heritage places can be considered part of their identity.

- In 2001, Japan named a hundred places as sites of 'fragrant scenery'. Initially, a list of 600 applications were submitted from all over the country. Among the selection there are natural scents such as flowers, trees, sea breeze, hot springs, fruits such as mandarin oranges, kabosu and apples, as well as traditional crafts such as glue, ink, incense, tea, salted seaweed and local special products.
- In 2018, UNESCO recognised the first inscription of olfactory heritage by adding the skills related to perfume in Pays de Grasse to the list of intangible cultural heritage (ICH). The skills cover three different aspects: "the cultivation of perfume plants; the knowledge and processing of natural raw materials; and the art of perfume composition".
- In 2021, the City of Melbourne recognised as a "site of local significance" the former Kraft Vegemite factory in Fishermans Bend, in part because of the "distinctive odour" of the iconic Australian food which was produced in there since the 1920s. The National Trust of Australia (Victoria) lobbied for the inclusion, noting that, "Our campaign for the smell to be recognised is about acknowledging that the significance of this place goes beyond the bricks and mortar of the factory building."
- In 2021, France has passed a law protecting the "sensory heritage" of its rural areas, which goes beyond the fragrant to include malodours. The legislation is the first to not only inscribe the notion of sensory heritage into the law, but also to define sensory heritage as an inextricable part of a nation's shared heritage, and to provide some broad guidelines for the operationalisation of the defining and protecting of the countryside's sensory heritage.

== Examples of olfactory heritage ==
The smell of old books and historic libraries has been identified as of cultural significance, with several projects documenting the scent of particular collections and spaces such as the Morgan Library & Museum, the Wren Library at St Paul's Cathedral and books from the Bodleian library.

== See also ==
- Olfactory memory
