= Olfactory memory =

Recollection of odors

Olfactory memory refers to the recollection of odors. Studies have found various characteristics of common memories of odor memory including persistence and high resistance to interference. Explicit memory is typically the form focused on in the studies of olfactory memory, though implicit forms of memory certainly supply distinct contributions to the understanding of odors and memories of them. Research has demonstrated that the changes to the olfactory bulb and main olfactory system following birth are extremely important and influential for maternal behavior. Mammalian olfactory cues play an important role in the coordination of the mother infant bond, and the following normal development of the offspring. Maternal breast odors are individually distinctive, and provide a basis for recognition of the mother by her offspring.

Throughout evolutionary history, olfaction has served various purposes related to the survival of the species, such as the development of communication. Even in humans and other animals today, these survival and communication aspects are still functioning. There is also evidence suggesting that there are deficits in olfactory memory in individuals with brain degenerative diseases such as Parkinson's disease, Alzheimer's disease and other dementias. These individuals lose the ability to distinguish smells as their disease worsens. There is also research showing that deficits in olfactory memory can act as a base in assessing certain types of mental disorders such as depression as each mental disorder has its own distinct pattern of olfactory deficits.

== Mechanism ==
=== Physiology ===
==== Odorant ====
An odorant is a physiochemical molecule that binds to a specific receptor protein. In mammals, each olfactory receptor protein has one type of molecule that it responds to, known as the one-olfactory-one-neuron rule, and approximately one thousand kinds of which have been identified. Structure and complexity constitute an odorant's features, with changes resulting in altered odorant quality. An odorant's features are detected by the olfactory system's glomeruli and mitral cells which can be found in the olfactory bulb, a cortical structure involved in the perceptual differentiation of odorants. The olfactory bulb itself affects how odors come to be encoded through its temporal structure and firing rate, which in turn influences the likelihood of an odorant being remembered.

==== Neuromodulators ====
Neuromodulation exists in the olfactory system and is responsible for neural plasticity and behavioural change in both mammals and insects. In the context of olfactory memory, neuromodulators regulate storage of information in a way that maintains the significance of the olfactory experience. These systems are highly dependent on norepinephrine and acetylcholine, which affect both implicit and explicit memory. Studies involving the noradrenergic system of mice demonstrate elimination of habitual learning when areas involving this system are lesioned, and subsequent restoration of habitual learning abilities when noradrenaline is injected into the olfactory bulb. The importance of cholinergic systems has been demonstrated in studies of rats and the effects of scopolamine, with acetylcholine being involved in initial learning stages and more specifically in the reduction of interference between stored memories.

=== Implicit odor memory ===
Implicit memories of stimuli do not require conscious recollection of the initial encounter of the stimulus. In regards to olfactory memory, deliberate recollection of an odor experience is not necessary in order for implicit memories of odors to form in the brain. Techniques used to study implicit olfactory memory are considered to be applicable to both humans and other animals. In tests of implicit memory, memory of a stimulus is shown to be aided by previous exposure to that same stimulus. Evidence of the formation of implicit memory is found in tests of habituation, sensitization, perceptual learning and classical conditioning. In olfaction there exists a strong tendency for habituation, which is discussed further in the following paragraph. By evaluating memory performance of tasks involving one of these 'subsets' of implicit memory, the effect of previous odor stimulus experience not involving conscious recollection can be measured. Further knowledge can be gained about implicit memory of odor through the study of the implications of cognitive deficits. The effects of brain injury on odor memory can be investigated through the use of these implicit memory measures leading to further overall understanding of the brain.

==== Habituation ====
Habituation involves decreased levels of attention and responsiveness to a stimulus that is no longer perceived as being novel. In the realm of olfactory memory, habituation refers to a decrease in responsiveness to an odor as a result of prolonged exposure (restricted to a certain repeated stimulus), which involves adaptation of cells in the olfactory system. Receptor neurons and mitral cells located in the olfactory system adapt in response to odors. This includes the involvement of piriform cortical neurons which adapt rapidly, more completely and selectively to novel odors and are also thought to play a very important role in the habituation of odors. Norepinephrine is considered to have an effect on the functioning of the mitral cells by increasing their responsiveness. Acetylcholine is also regarded as an important neurotransmitter involved in the habituation of olfactory stimulus, though the exact means through which it operates are not yet clear.

=== Explicit memory ===
Explicit, unlike implicit memory for odors, is thought by some to be a phenomenon that is exclusive to humans. Explicit memory refers to memories that are remembered with conscious awareness of doing so. In olfaction, explicit memory refers to attributing associative meaning to odors. Through the assignment of associations to odors as well as non-odor stimuli, olfactory stimuli can gain meaning. Explicit memories of odors include information which can be used to process and compare other encountered odors. Attention focused on odors aids in the functioning of everyday life as well as the engagement of proper responses to experienced events. Evidence of explicit olfaction memory is seen through behaviors in tasks involving a working memory component. The two most commonly used tests for explicit odor memory are odor identification and odor recognition, which are discussed in greater detail below. Together, odor recognition and identification are the components of olfactory training in patients with a loss of smell.

==== Odor recognition ====
Odor recognition is the most common and direct means used to measure odor memory. In an odor recognition test participants are asked whether or not they recognize an odor. More specifically, a participant is subjected to a certain olfactory-related stimulus, and after a delay period is asked to decide if a probe (a stimulus that could or could not be the same as the initial stimulus) is the same as the one he/she initially encountered. Memory accuracy is assessed by the amount of correct recognition decisions that are made. A potential problem with this measure involves the generation of verbal labels that may enhance memory for olfactory stimuli. There are various ways of measuring the effect of verbal labeling, which include comparison of odors and odor names, as well as the speed and accuracy with which lexical decisions are made regarding odor names. It has been suggested that odor recognition testing should be considered as a measure that involves both memory for perceptual information as well as potentially confounding memory due to the generation of verbal labels.

==== Odor identification ====
Odor identification requires the specific labeling of presented olfactory stimuli, unlike odor recognition. Neural coding refers to the way that the identity, concentration, and pleasurable value of olfactory stimuli are represented in the pattern of action potentials relayed to the brain from the olfactory bulb. Identification begins with an odorant binding to specific odorant receptor proteins. Olfactory receptor molecules are very similar to G-protein-linked receptors and belong to the odorant receptor gene family. The specificity of odor recognition is the result of the molecular variety of odorant receptor proteins and their interaction with the odorant molecules. However, the specific mechanism of certain receptors binding with certain odorant molecules is not well understood. Odorant receptor genes also play a major role in odor identification. Expression in olfactory receptor neurons has been confirmed for a limited subset of the huge number of odorant receptor genes. Genetic analysis shows that odorant receptor neurons express only one type of odorant receptor gene. It is hypothesized that different odors activate different receptors, and genetic regulation of odorant receptors results in the diversity for olfactory receptor neurons and this allows the capacity of olfactory systems to detect and encode a wide range of complex and novel odors in the environment.

=== Hemispheric differences ===
Although bilateral activation of the brain has been seen with unilateral stimulation (accomplished by placing a stimulus under one nostril only), the activation seen is not exactly equal in both hemispheres. Different parts of the brain are involved in olfactory memory, depending on what type of memory is being processed (e.g. implicit memory-habituation or explicit memory-recognition) and this is evident in the results of explicit and implicit tasks of memory. Studies have shown that the left hemisphere is activated during verbal semantic retrieval of odor-related memories, while the right hemisphere shows activation during non-verbal retrieval of semantic odor-related information. Much overlap does occur between regions, however. Information of odors of a semantic nature is distributed across both sides of the brain, although the right hemisphere is more involved in the processing of odor quality and previous encounter of the stimulus than the left. Neural plasticity is also an important part of olfaction, as different experiences may result in alterations of both cortical and subcortical circuitry in the brain.

=== Role of the amygdala ===
The amygdala is a complex set of nuclei situated in the anterior temporal lobe and lies beneath the primary olfactory cortex. The amygdala is involved in the formation of memories of emotional experiences, particularly those associated with fear, flight, and defense. It is connected by various pathways to other parts of the brain, but most notably to the basal forebrain which contains magnocellular cells which provide extensive input into the neocortex and hippocampus. There are also direct projections to the hippocampus from the amygdala, which are involved in the integration of various sensations into memory. Neuropsychological research has suggested that this pathway is vital for the development of olfactory memories. The primary olfactory cortex and the hippocampus have extensive connections with the amygdala through both indirect and direct pathways. It is important for an animal to create memories of olfactory stimuli which threaten its survival. Without a properly functioning amygdala, olfactory memories would not be able to form which could put an animal at risk of dangerous stimuli in its environment due its lack of memory of such stimuli.

== Behavioural effects ==
Odors can evoke positive autobiographical memories and increase positive emotions, decrease negative mood states, disrupt cravings, and reduce physiological indices of stress, including systemic markers of inflammation. The recall of memories triggered by odors is referred to as the Proust Phenomenon, named after the writer Marcel Proust, who in his novel Swann's Way (Proust, 1922) depicted how the taste and smell of a madeleine dipped in linden tea brought back vivid recollections from his past. The particularities of these odor-evoked memories are synthesized in a model described by the acronym LOVER. They are described as Limbic, Older, Vivid, Emotional, and Rare.

=== Neurological and structural development ===
Studies demonstrate that the changes to the olfactory bulb and main olfactory system following birth are extremely important and influential for maternal behavior. Pregnancy and childbirth result in a high state of plasticity of the olfactory system that may facilitate olfactory learning within the mother. Neurogenesis likely facilitates the formation of olfactory memory in the mother, as well as the infant. A significant change takes place in the regulation of olfaction just after birth so that odors related with the offspring are no longer aversive, allowing the female to positively respond to her babies. Research with a variety of animals suggest the role of norepinephrine in olfactory learning, in which norepinephrine neurons in the locus coeruleus send projections to neurons in the main and accessory olfactory bulbs. This is significant in the formation of olfactory memory and learning.

The main olfactory bulb is one of the neural structures that experiences profound change when exposed to offspring odors at the time of childbirth. Human neuroimaging studies suggest that activation of the medial prefrontal cortex (mPFC) occurs during tests of olfactory memory. The medial prefrontal cortex receives extensive olfactory projections, which are activated immediately after birth in correspondence with primary olfactory processing regions. Although there is no functional specificity for the main or accessory olfactory systems in the development of maternal behaviors, it has been shown that the main olfactory system is affected when individual odor discrimination of the offspring is required; this system experiences significant change following exposure to offspring odors after giving birth. Changes in synaptic circuitry also contribute to the level of maternal responsiveness and memorization to these odors.

=== Olfactory cues ===
==== Mammalian studies ====
Mammalian olfactory cues play an important role in the coordination of the mother infant bond, and the following normal development of the offspring. The offspring of several different mammals are attracted to the odor of amniotic fluid, which helps to calm and adapt the infant to the novel environment outside of the womb. Sheep form olfactory recognition memory for their lambs within 2–4 hours of giving birth, which causes the mother to subsequently reject advances from unfamiliar lambs and scents. This bond is thought to be enhanced by olfactory cues that cause enhanced transmission across synapses of the olfactory bulb. After the birth of the offspring, there is a shift in the value of the infant's odors to the mother, which causes change in neural structures such as the olfactory bulb. These changes contribute to maternal responsiveness and memorization of these odors. Olfactory cues from the baby lamb are important in establishing maternal behavior and bonding. After birth, the smell of amniotic fluid (which was previously disgusting) becomes attractive for ewes.

Amniotic fluid is one of the primary olfactory cues that the ewe is exposed to after birth, allowing her to be attracted to any newborn lamb associated with that amniotic fluid. The amniotic fluid produces olfactory cues, and a response from the ewe that cause her to be attracted to the newborn lamb. When newborn lambs were washed with soap (or even water) it greatly reduced the degree of licking behavior by the maternal ewe, and consequently prevented her from displaying acceptance behavior towards the newborn. The main olfactory system in sheep is quite significant in the developing appropriate maternal behaviors in sheep.

Physiological, behavioral and anatomical evidence show that some species may have a functioning olfactory system in utero. Newborn infants respond positively to the smell of their own amniotic fluid, which may serve as evidence for intrauterine olfactory learning. Mammals' sense of smell becomes mature at an early stage of development. Fetal olfactory memory has been demonstrated in rats, for example. This is shown by rat pups, who avoid odors that they experienced in association with a noxious stimulus prior to birth. While animal studies play an important role in helping discover and learn olfaction memory of humans, it is important to pay attention to the specifics of each study, as they cannot always be generalized across all species.

==== Human studies ====
Research studies provide evidence that the fetus becomes familiar with chemical cues in the intrauterine environment. Intrauterine olfactory learning may be demonstrated by behavioral evidence that newborn infants respond positively to the smell of their own amniotic fluid. Infants are responsive to the olfactory cues associated with maternal breast odors. They are able to recognize and react favorably to scents emitted from their own mother's breasts, despite the fact that they also may be attracted to breast odors from unfamiliar nursing females in a different context. The unique scent of the mother (to the infant) is referred to as her olfactory signature. While breasts are a source of the unique olfactory cue of the mother, infants are also able to recognize and respond with familiarity and preference to their mother's underarm scent.

Olfactory cues are widespread within parental care to assist in the dynamic of the mother-infant relationship, and later development of the offspring. In support of fetal olfactory learning, newborn infants display behavioral attraction to the odor of amniotic fluid. For example, babies would more often suck from a breast treated with an amount of their own amniotic fluid, rather than the alternative untreated breast. Newborns are initially attracted to their own amniotic fluid because that odor is familiar. Although exposure to amniotic fluid is eliminated after birth, breast fed babies have continued contact with cues from the mother's nipple and areola area. This causes breast odors to become more familiar and attractive, while amniotic fluid loses its positive value. Maternal breast odors are individually distinctive, and provide a basis for recognition of the mother by her offspring.

=== Role of olfaction in maternal bonding and subsequent development ===
As demonstrated by animals in the wild (the great apes, for example), the offspring is held by the mother immediately after birth without cleaning and is continually exposed to the familiar odor of the amniotic fluid (making the transition from the intrauterine to extrauterine environment less overwhelming). In newborn mammals, the nipple area of the mother is significant as the sole source of necessary nutrients. The maternal olfactory scent that is unique to the mother becomes associated with food intake, and newborns who do not gain access to the mother's breasts would die shortly after birth. As a result, it seems natural selection should favor the development of a means to help in maintain and establish effective breast feeding. Maternal breast odors signal the presence of a food source for the newborn. These breast odors bring forth positive responses in neonates from as young as 1 hour or less through to several weeks postpartum. The mother's olfactory signature is experienced with reinforcing stimuli such as food, warmth and tactile stimulation; enhancing further learning of that cue.

While infants are generally attracted to the odors produced by lactating women, infants are particularly responsive to their mother's unique scent. These olfactory cues are used in mammals during maternal care for coordination of mother-infant interaction. Familiarization with odors that will be encountered after birth may help the baby adapt to the otherwise unfamiliar environment. Neural structures such as the olfactory bulb undergo extensive changes when exposed to infantile odors; providing a starting point for individual recognition by the mother. odors from the breasts of lactating women serve as attractants for neonates, regardless of feeding history of the infant. Maternal olfactory learning occurs due to the high state of plasticity and flux within the olfactory system during pregnancy and childbirth.

== Evolution ==
=== Search for food ===
Studies of the mammalian brain have discovered that the excess of cerebral neurons is a phenomenon of mainly animals which had to seek and capture food. These neurons have become a large part of the olfactory system throughout evolution to allow higher mammals such as primates to have a better chance for survival through more advanced methods of hunting and finding food. For example, the vulture has a large part of its brain committed to olfactory senses. This allows for it to be able to detect food at long ranges without being able to see it. Having memory for various types of food aids in survival by allowing the animals to remember which scent is edible and which is not.

=== Communication and identification ===
Olfactory memory has also been developed throughout evolution to help animals recognize other animals. It is suggested that smell allows for young infants to identify with their mothers or for humans to identify between males and females. Olfaction cues were also used, and are still used, by many animals to mark territory, protecting themselves from other threats to their survival. While the development of other sensory systems, such as the visual system and auditory systems, has decreased how reliant some animals are on the olfactory system, there is still evidence that shows these animals' olfactory systems still have a strong influence on their social interactions. The memory for specific odorants gives the animal an opportunity to communicate with members of the same species and allows for lack of communication between species that do not have the proper receptor systems for the odor. These chemical signals can also be sensed in the dark or even under water.

=== Sexual reproduction ===
Olfaction is a very important aspect in sexual reproduction throughout evolution because it triggers mating behaviour in many species. Pheromones as olfactory chemical signals allow for members of the same species to perceive when other members are ready for reproduction. It can also lead to the synchronization of menstrual cycles in females within the species and influence sexual attraction between members within the species. Having an unconscious memory for such processes has allowed for species to survive.

=== Warning stimulus ===
The development of a sense of smell is also thought to have arisen to function as an arousal system. Once an odor enters into conscious memory, it can signal the presence of a threat, like the smell of gas or smoke. However, odor memory can also be an implicit or unconscious process. This ability to respond automatically to a warning stimulus is much like pre-attentive processes in other sensory systems which involve the use of automatic forms of memory. These response patterns have evolved over time and involve a wide variety of motor and autonomic responses which are integrated into the behaviour pattern of reacting to a warning stimulus. odor-induced anxiety can be caused when an animal senses a predator. A study conducted on rats showed that when a rat was exposed to cat odors, there was increased anxiety-related behaviour in the rat. The cat odor induced an inhibition of the endocannabinoid system in the amygdala which has been suggested to induce anxiety-related responses.

== Deficits ==
=== Olfactory deficits in the brain ===
Olfactory memory deficits can be significant indicators of brain damage and pathology. There is evidence to suggest that certain mental disorders not only produce olfactory deficits but also predict them. Evidence has been found for a number of disorders, including schizophrenia, Parkinson's disease, Huntington's disease, alcoholic Korsakoff's syndrome, and Alzheimer's disease. In animal research certain brain altering drugs such as anti-depressants produce deficits in olfactory memory. In testing the effects of anti-depressants on olfactory sensitivity in mice, the "mice were tested in a Y-maze with a choice between an odorant (butanol) or distilled water before and during 3 weeks of daily intra-peritoneal injection of either citalopram or clomipramine. Their performance was compared with those of a control group injected with a saline solution" and the results were that significant olfactory deficits were found during the three-week period of testing.

=== Olfactory deficits and testing ===
Many tests have been developed to test olfactory memory in patients with mental disorders. The 40-item University of Pennsylvania Smell Identification Test (UPSIT) and the 12-item Brief Smell Identification Test, that was developed from the UPSIT, both test olfactory identification using a scratch and sniff booklet. The Sniffin' Sticks olfactory test consists of several pens that hold different scents and different dilutions, and this test provides scores for three olfactory domains: identification, threshold and discrimination.

=== Olfactory deficits and prediction of mental illness or disease ===
Olfactory deficits have been found in patients with mental disorders and there is evidence suggesting that olfactory deficits can be a predictor of mental illness and disease. Research suggests that olfactory memory deficits can be good predictors of several mental disorders such as depression, dementia and neurodegeneration, as each disorder has its own distinct features leading to specific predictions about what type of mental disorder a person may have.

== See also ==
- Olfaction
- Olfactory system
- Memory
- University of Pennsylvania Smell Identification Test
- Insect olfaction
- Olfactory heritage
