= Scent preservation =

Scent preservation, also called smell archiving, is the practice of heritage conservation applied to odor.

Some universities have academic and practical research projects in museology and cultural heritage for preserving scent.

Aspects of scent preservation include identification, analysis, and archiving of scents.

Several countries have programs for preserving scent heritage.

Preserving the smell of a historic site contributes to its authenticity.

Mammalian evolution and primate ancestry have led humans to appreciate scent as a necessary part of culture.

Preserving volatile scents is a technical challenge.

A case study presented the society of Zanzibar as having a need for scent preservation to communicate cultural elements.

== See also ==
- Olfactory heritage
