= Jeongok Prehistory Museum =

- Established: April 25, 2011; 13 years ago
- Location: Yeoncheon, South Korea
- Coordinates: 38.011582°N 127.063781°E
- Type: Natural history museum

The Jeongok Prehistory Museum (Korean: 전곡선사박물관) is a museum in Yeoncheon, South Korea. The museum exhibits are based on the natural history of the Chugaryeong rift valley.

== History ==
The museum was established to conserve archaeological artifacts such as the Acheulean axe, which was found in an excavation in the Hantangang River in Yeoncheon County. The construction of the museum cost 48.2 million won, financed by the Gyeonggi Cultural Foundation. In 2011 it was considered the largest prehistoric museum on the Korean peninsula. The museum was designed by X-tu's French architects, Anouk Legendre and Nicolas Desmazieres. In 2012, the museum won the award of excellence at the Korean Architecture Awards. Since 2016, the museum has been part of the Google Arts & Culture platform. In 2019, the museum won a bronze International Design Excellence Awards medal: the prehistory museum is the first Korean museum to receive this award.

== Collections ==
The museum contains one of the earliest axes in East Asia, as well as several relics dating back to the Stone Age. In addition, the museum contains fossils of Sahelanthropus and Homo sapiens that lived in Pyongyang. The museum has exhibits on human evolution as well as exhibits on stone tools. The museum also has exhibits on mammoths The museum contains cave paintings and primitive huts about early human life in Korea. The museum contains a 5,000-year-old mummy, as well as fossils of Ice Age animals such as cave bears, primitive horses, saber-toothed tigers and mammoths. The museum contains models of humans as well as excavated Jeongok-ri artifacts. In April 2021, the museum presented an exhibition about the Paleolithic period in which 120 objects including prehistoric clothing, burial relics, artwork and stone tools were exhibited. In October 2021, the museum received a painting of a dragon called "Taehwang Yongseongyeongdo" by Buddhist artist Monk Taehwang.
