= Content and language integrated learning =

Learning through an additional language

Content and language integrated learning (CLIL) is an approach for learning content through an additional language (foreign or second), thus teaching both the subject and the language. CLIL can take different forms depending on how content and language teaching are integrated and on the respective roles of content and language teachers.

== CLIL origin ==
The term CLIL was created in 1994 by David Marsh as a methodology similar to but distinct from language immersion and content-based instruction. The idea of its proponents was to create an "umbrella term" which encompasses different forms of using language as the medium of instruction. CLIL has also been examined critically in relation to educational access and inequality, particularly where opportunities to participate are associated with socioeconomic advantage.

== CLIL and language immersion ==
CLIL is fundamentally based on methodological principles established by research on language immersion. This kind of approach has been identified as very important by the European Commission because: "It can provide effective opportunities for pupils to use their new language skills now, rather than learn them now for later use. It opens doors on languages for a broader range of learners, nurturing self-confidence in young learners and those who have not responded well to formal language instruction in general education. It provides exposure to the language without requiring extra time in the curriculum, which can be of particular interest in vocational settings." This approach involves learning subjects such as history, geography, managerial skills/concepts or others, through an additional language. CLIL has been promoted as a means of supporting language learning alongside subject learning and of encouraging positive attitudes towards language learning.

The European Commission has therefore decided to promote the training of teachers to "...enhancing the language competences in general, in order to promote the teaching of non-linguistic subjects in foreign languages".

== CLIL objectives ==
CLIL objectives are varied, but among the most relevant ones the following can be pointed out: To improve the educational system. To establish the necessary conditions that will allow students to achieve the appropriate level of academic performance in CLIL subjects. To improve students' proficiency in both their mother tongue and the target language, attaching the same importance to each. To develop the intercultural understanding. To develop social and thinking skills.

CLIL advocates claim that this educational approach: Improves L1 and L2 development. Prepares students for the globalized world. Increases students' motivation to learn foreign languages. Promotes the learning of a more extensive and varied vocabulary. Enhances students' confidence in the target language. Improves language competence in the target language, CLIL being more beneficial than traditional foreign language teaching courses. Helps develop intercultural competence.

Research syntheses provide a more qualified picture of these claimed benefits. Evidence of language-learning gains is strongest for vocabulary and receptive skills, while findings for other areas of language development are mixed. Research on content-learning outcomes is also inconclusive, and comparisons between CLIL and non-CLIL learners can be complicated by factors including self-selection, learner motivation, socioeconomic background and differences in the amount of exposure to the additional language.

== CLIL in English as an international language ==
The integration of content and language learning in English as an international language (EIL) is found in approaches to bilingual education. These approaches include immersion, content-based instruction (CBI), content-based language teaching (CBLT), and the movement towards English medium instruction (EMI). These approaches overlap, but differ in their histories, educational contexts and stated language-learning aims.

=== Multiplicity of terms ===
The multiplicity of terms used to refer to instructional approaches for the integration of content and language learning (immersion, CBI, CBLT, CLIL, EMI) can be a source of confusion. CLIL and CBI generally involve an explicit dual focus on content and language learning, whereas EMI is commonly defined without an explicit language-learning objective, even though language development may be expected as a subsidiary outcome. Debate continues about the extent to which immersion, CBLT, CBI, and CLIL are different, similar, or the same. Some argue that CLIL represents an appropriate umbrella term that can be used to house various approaches towards content integration (e.g., immersion is a type of CLIL), where terms can be used interchangeably (e.g., CLIL and CBI are the same concept with a different name). However, others argue that CLIL and CBI represent very different concepts, where CLIL represents the intersection between content and language from the content perspective (i.e., CLIL happens in content classes), while CBI is an attempt at responding to the content needs of learners in language classes.

The similarities and variability between approaches lead to circular arguments about whether the key features of one approach are also shared by others (e.g., immersion and CLIL), and therefore whether they can be clearly distinguished. In some ways, this is an inevitable result of terms being used outside academia, by educators applying ideas from one context to another, and the lines of demarcation become more unclear as approaches are transported to different countries and contextualized to meet different learning situations.

In EIL studies, different terms have been associated with different regions, such as CLIL, which is associated with Europe, and was "purposefully coined" by European educators and researchers attempting to influence language policy and ideology. CLIL represented a deliberate attempt to develop a European model for additive bilingual education. However, policy makers, educators, and researchers from international contexts have started to apply and develop CLIL approaches in distinctly non-European situations, and the term is now widely used within the wider international foreign language learning community.

== See also ==
- Language immersion
- Bilingual education
- Content-based instruction
