= Associative meaning =

Concept in linguistics

According to the semantic analysis of Geoffrey Leech, the associative meaning of an expression has to do with individual mental understandings of the speaker. They, in turn, can be broken up into five sub-types: connotative, collocative, social, affective and reflected (Mwihaki 2004).

- The connotative meanings of an expression are the thoughts provoked by a term when in reference to certain entities. Though these meanings may not be strictly implied by relevant definitions, they show up in common or preferred usage regardless. This is not to be confused with what is historically referred to as connotation, which more closely describes rigid definitions of words.
- Collocative meaning, or "collocation", describes words that regularly appear together in common use (within certain contexts).
- Social meaning, where words are used to establish relationships between people and to delineate social roles. For example, in Japanese, the suffix "-san" when added to a proper name denotes respect, sometimes indicating that the speaker is subordinate to the listener; while the suffix "-chan" denotes that the speaker thinks the listener is a child or childlike (either for purposes of affection or derision).
- Affective meaning has to do with the personal feelings or attitudes of the speaker.
- Reflected meaning has to do with when one sense of a particular word affects the understanding and usage of all the other senses of the word.
- Thematic meaning concerns itself with how the order of words spoken affects the meaning that is entailed.

== Related links ==
- Mwihaki, Alice. (2004)
