= La Chapelle-aux-Saints =

- Commune
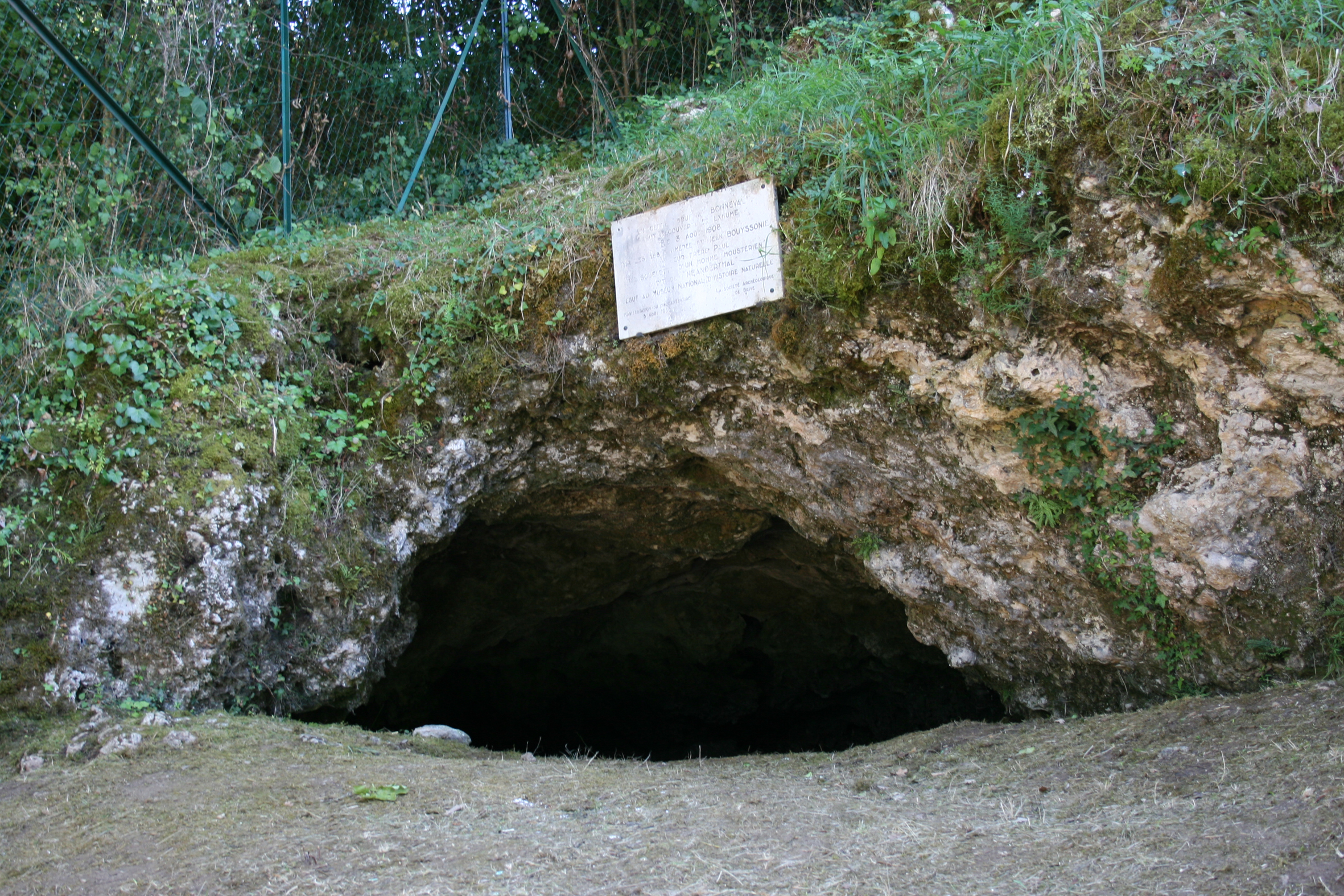
- La Bouffia Bonneval, the discovery site of the Neanderthal burials of La Chapelle-aux-Saints

- Coat of arms
- Location of La Chapelle-aux-Saints
- Location within France Location within Nouvelle-Aquitaine
- Coordinates: 44°59′17″N 1°43′34″E
- Country: France
- Region: Nouvelle-Aquitaine
- Department: Corrèze
- Arrondissement: Brive-la-Gaillarde
- Canton: Midi Corrézien

Government
  - Mayor (2026–32): Sylvie Bonneval
- Area^{1}: 4.72 km^{2} (1.82 sq mi)
- Highest elevation: 191 m (627 ft)
- Lowest elevation: 120 m (390 ft)
- Population (2023): 257
  - Density: 54.4/km^{2} (141/sq mi)
- Time zone: UTC+01:00 (CET)
  - Summer (DST): UTC+02:00 (CEST)
- INSEE/Postal code: 19044 /19120
- ^{1} French Land Register data, which excludes lakes, ponds, glaciers > 1 km^{2} (0.386 sq mi or 247 acres) and river estuaries.

La Chapelle-aux-Saints (French pronunciation: [la ʃapɛl o sɛ̃]; Occitan: La Chapela daus Sents) is a commune in the Corrèze department in central France.

== History ==
=== Neanderthal skeleton ===
The La Chapelle-aux-Saints cave, bordering the Sourdoire valley, revealed many archeological artifacts belonging to the late Mousterian techno-complex, including the first ever recognized Neanderthal burial discovered on 3 August 1908. Jean and Amédée Bouyssonie, as well as L. Bardon, led archaeological digs in the cave from 1905 to 1908, discovering over 1,000 pieces of stone industry (mainly flint), bones of different fauna including reindeer, bovid, horse, fox, wolf and even a rhinoceros’ tooth. The most spectacular discovery was that of a very well preserved skeleton of an adult Neanderthal man who appears to have been intentionally buried in a rectangular pit 30 centimetres (12 in) deep, 1.45 metres (4.8 ft) long and 1 metre (3.3 ft) wide.

This discovery led to a controversy for the existence of burials during the Mousterian. Arguments for the existence of a tomb were the sleeping position of the body, and the funeral "gifts" associated with the pit like stone tools and animal bones. Some archaeologists believe the Chapelle-aux-Saints cave wasn't used as a habitat, but a place for funeral feasts.

=== Modern period ===
During the French Revolution, the commune changed its name to La Chapelle-aux-Prés following a decree from the National Convention but was later changed to the Commune-aux-Pres.

== Geography ==
=== Location ===
La Chapelle-aux-Saints is located in the south of the department of Corrèze, bordering that of Lot. The commune is about thirty kilometres south of Tulle and about thirty kilometres south-east of Brive-la-Gaillarde, near Collonges-la-Rouge.

== Population ==
Historical population
Year	Pop.	±% p.a.
1968	221	—
1975	217	−0.26%
1982	206	−0.74%
1990	179	−1.74%
1999	164	−0.97%
2007	203	+2.70%
2012	243	+3.66%
2017	266	+1.83%
2023	257	−0.57%
Source: INSEE

== Culture and heritage ==
=== Places and monuments ===
==== Neanderthal Museum ====
The Bouffia Bonneval is the site of the discovery in 1908 of the Man of La Chapelle-aux-Saints, a site listed as a historical monument by decree of March 11, 1981.

The former Neanderthal Museum-Jean Bouyssonie at the place called Sourdoire, inaugurated in July 1996, with a reconstruction, directed by Jean-Louis Heim, of the skeleton of the man of La Chapelle-aux-Saints as it was discovered by the Bouyssonie brothers in 1908. Display cases and panels showcased the tools, environment and way of life of Neanderthals. The museum is closed in 2025.

The new Néandertal : l'Homme de La Chapelle aux Saints museum, next to the burial site, opened in July 2025, offering several scenographic (video mapping, audio-guide) and interactive rooms, to make the knowledge accessible starting from the 1908 discovery and the scientific advances around Neanderthals since then. It is located near the Bouffia Bonneval that has a footbridge to the burial site.

==== L'église Saint-Namphaise ====
The church of Saint-Namphaise, dedicated to a 9th century hermit from Quercy, dates from the twelfth century, and with an octagonal bell tower with three floors and a trefoil portal in the Limousin style. It has a polychrome wooden pieta from the 1600s and two gilded wooden statues on the altar, dedicated to Saints Peter and Paul. Coats of arms in the apse represent the Plas family of Curemonte and Lostanges.

== See also ==
- Communes of the Corrèze department
- La Chapelle-aux-Saints 1
