= Realia (education) =

Objects from real life used in classroom instruction

In education, realia (/riːˈeɪlɪə/) are objects from real life used in classroom instruction by educators to improve students' learning. A teacher of a foreign language often employs realia to strengthen students' associations between words for common objects and the objects themselves. In many cases, these objects are part of an instructional kit that includes a manual and is thus considered as being part of a documentary whole by librarians.

Realia are also used to connect learners with the key focal point of a lesson by allowing tactile and multidimensional connection between learned material and the object of the lesson. They are best represented by simple objects lending themselves to classroom settings and ease of control with minimum risk of accident throughout the student-object interaction.

Technology has begun to impact the use of realia by adding the virtual realia option, whereby three-dimensional models can be displayed through projection or on computer screens, allowing the learner to see detail otherwise difficult to acquire. The option of zooming and looking within objects makes virtual realia an important learning tool in technical environments where it may be difficult or impractical to examine an object in as much detail manually, such as the workings of living organs or machinery containing hazardous parts, such as combustion engines.

== Realia in the classroom ==
Realia are real objects such as specimens of plants or animals, and machines or tools, as they are known to exist or used in life situations. They can be useful in presenting a learning experience while improving the retention of concepts learned. The use of realia is commonplace in the classroom and is widely considered to have great value in fostering an active teaching-learning environment. Realia can be useful in all subject areas of the curriculum; and is appropriate for any age level of students, from beginner to advance.

In language teaching, for example, realia provides language learners with multi-sensory impressions of the language through seeing, hearing, touching, and manipulating items. Interaction with authentic materials, aids in the teaching-learning instruction by bringing students into contact with language as it is used in real-life situations in order to meet actual communication needs. Moreover, the use of realia can enhance linguistic and cultural understanding and appreciation, which are both prerequisites for real language learning.

The increasing integration of computers into the classroom and the phenomenal growth of the Internet has brought about the need to combine the new educational technologies with teaching practices and techniques. Virtual realia are digitized objects and items which are now brought into the classroom as examples or aids. They are often used to stimulate interest in the learning experience. While traditional realia is a real object in nature, when transferred to a more interactive and flexible medium, virtual realia merges an established technique with the new educational technologies in bringing culturally-based authentic materials into the classrooms (Smith, 1997).

Realia, whether traditional or virtual, have been found to be useful to improve the retention of concepts learned in the classroom. Real specimens such as plants, machines or tools enrich learning and make it more concrete, authentic and interesting as the learner is made to handle and study these things directly. The presentation of real objects in the classroom, as they are known to exist or used in life situations provides first-hand or direct experiences for learners.
