= Eugène Van Dievoet =

Belgian architect (1862–1937)

Major Eugène Van Dievoet II Off. O. Crown, K. O. Leopold, Military Cross
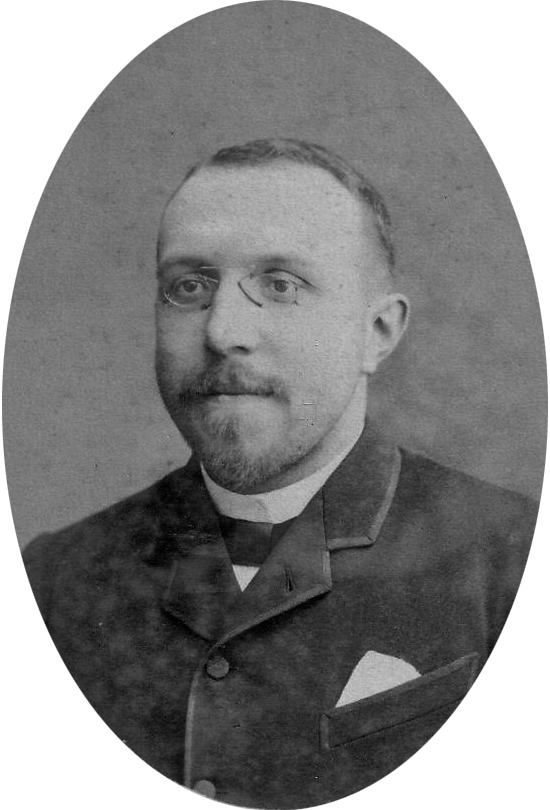
- Born: 9 May 1862; Brussels
- Died: 20 March 1937 (aged 74)
- Citizenship: Belgium
- Education: Royal Military Academy
- Occupations: Architect, military engineer, professor
- Parent(s): Ernest Jean-Louis Van Dievoet and Léonie Joséphine Françoise Most
- Family: Van Dievoet family
- Honours: Knight of the Order of Léopold (Military Division); Officer of the Order of the Crown; Military Cross (First Class); Commemorative Medal of the reign of HM Léopold II

Major Eugène Van Dievoet II (/ˈdiːvʊt/, 9 May 1862–20 March 1937), was a Belgian architect and Major of military engineering. He mainly designed Art Deco and Beaux-Arts in Brussels.

== Biography ==
Eugène Van Dievoet is the son of Ernest Jean-Louis Van Dievoet (Brussels, 16 July 1835 - Saint-Gilles, 28 August 1903) and Léonie Joséphine Françoise Most (Antwerp, 14 July 1838 - Brussels 1943), daughter of Ferdinand Gustave Adolphe Most and Ghislaine Philippine Pauline Delsart; and the grandson of Eugène Van Dievoet and Hortense Poelaert, sister of the famous architect Joseph Poelaert. He is therefore the first cousin of the architect Henri Van Dievoet and the Art Nouveau decorator Gabriel Van Dievoet.

He married Léonie Caroline Catherine Quarez, born in Liège on 22 May 1865 and died in Woluwe-Saint-Lambert, rue Vergote 30, on 6 December 1944, daughter of Philippe Guillaume Quarez and Catherine Lambertine Marie Ogis. They did not have children.

== Career ==
Eugène Van Dievoet began his career as a military architect and trained at the Royal Military Academy (48th class, engineering, 1880–1885).

He was Major of military engineering, engineer, professor at the Royal Military Academy and member of the Royal Society of Archeology of Brussels since 1936.

After his military activities, he became a civil architect (living in rue Vergote 30) and built many houses and apartment buildings in Art Deco style or Beaux-Arts in Brussels.

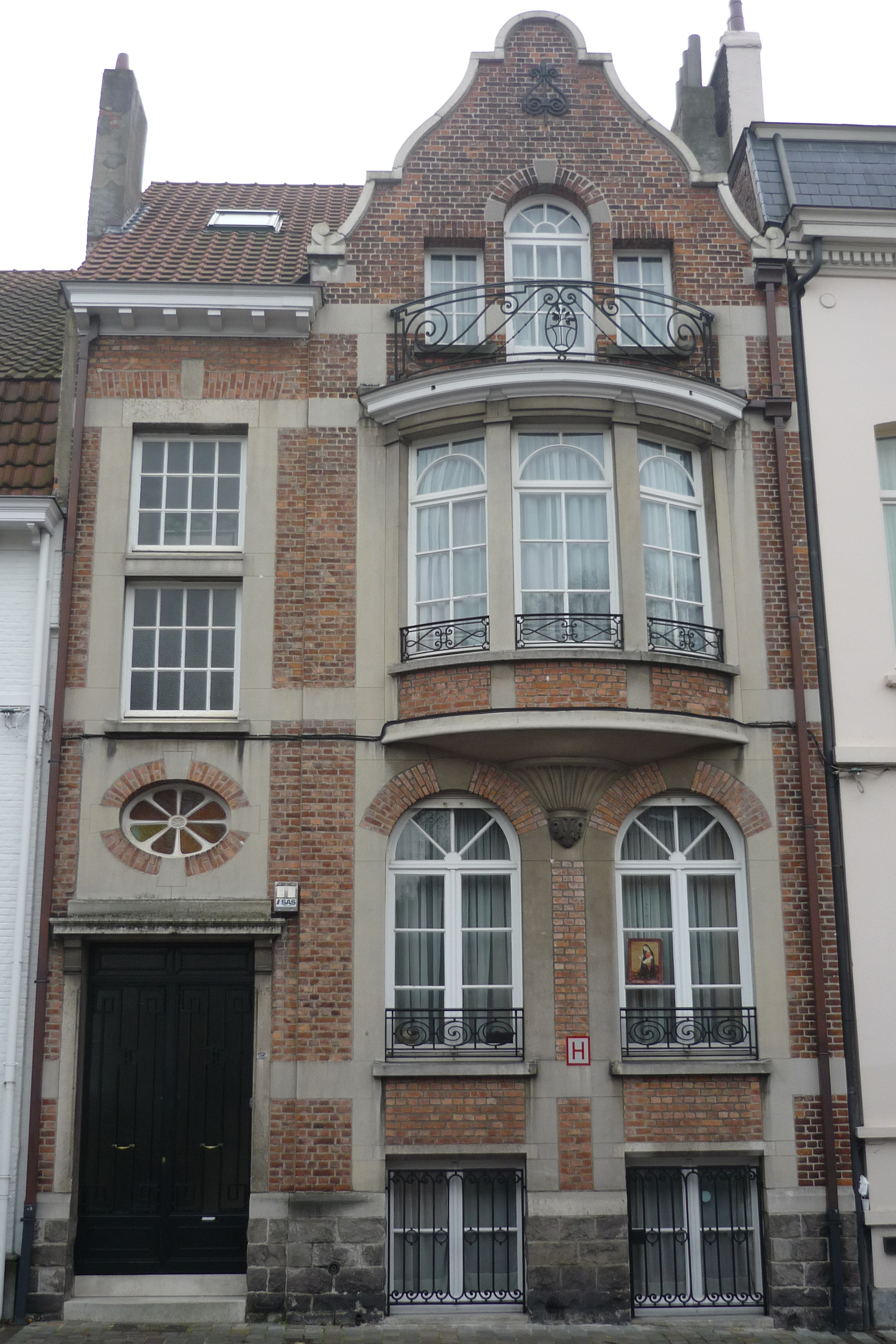
Woluwe-Saint-Lambert : rue Vergote 30 (previously n° 14 in Schaerbeek), personal home of the architecte, Bourgeois house in eclectic style and of Beaux-Arts inspiration.

== Works ==
- 1922 : Schaerbeek : House of Monsieur Louis Brison, stockbroker, boulevard Reyers, 120, Bourgeois house in bricks and stone, Louis XV style.
- 1923 : Brussels, rue des Fabriques, n° 32, Bourgeois house in Beaux-Arts style.
- 1923 : Brussels, rue des Fabriques n° 32A to 36A, 5-story appartient building in Art Deco style.
- 1923 : Woluwe-Saint-Lambert : rue Vergote 30 (previously n° 14 in Schaerbeek), personal home of the architecte, Bourgeois house in eclectic style and of Beaux-Arts inspiration.
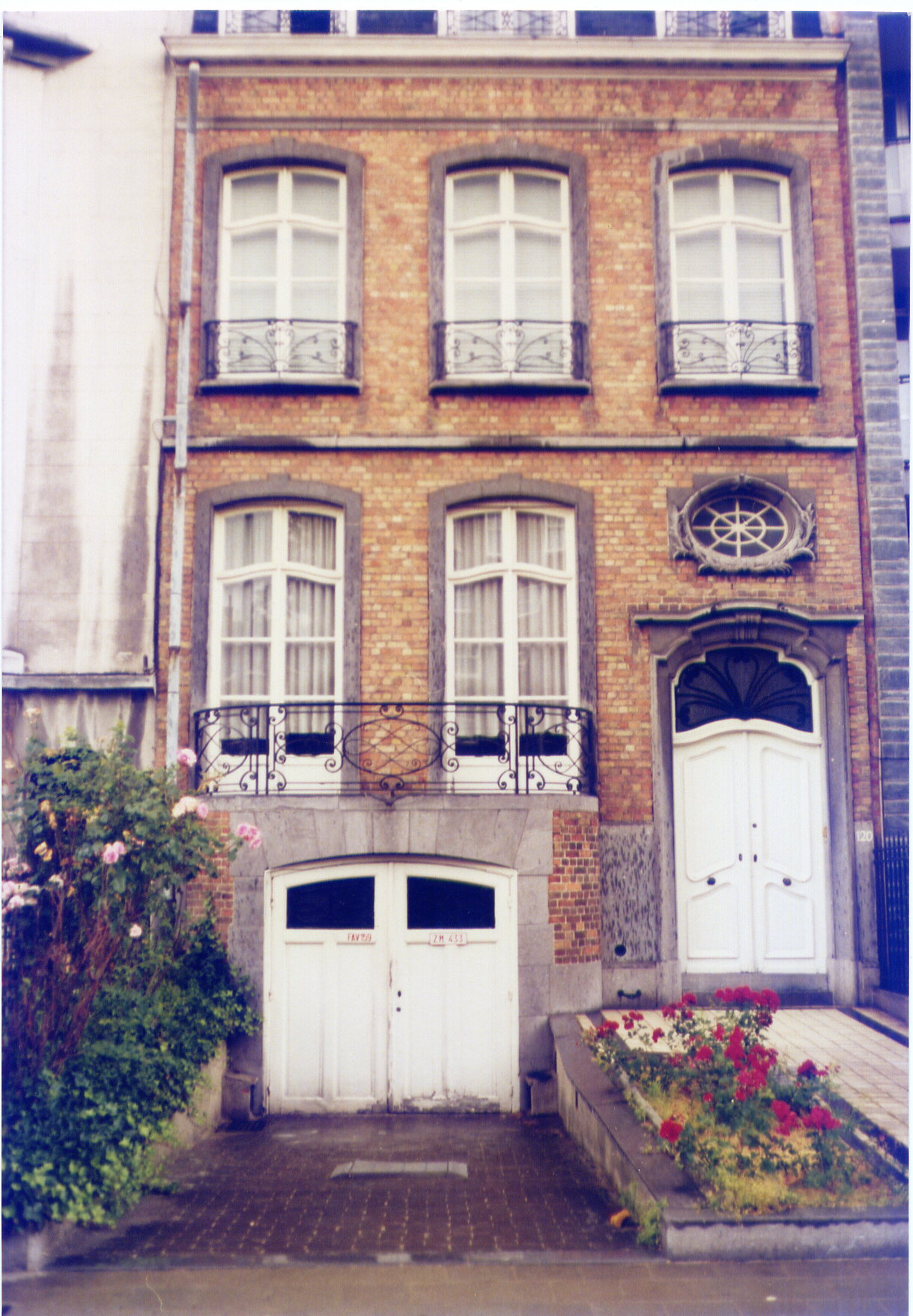
  1922 : Schaerbeek, house of Monsieur Louis Brison, boulevard Reyers, 120 (Louis XV style).
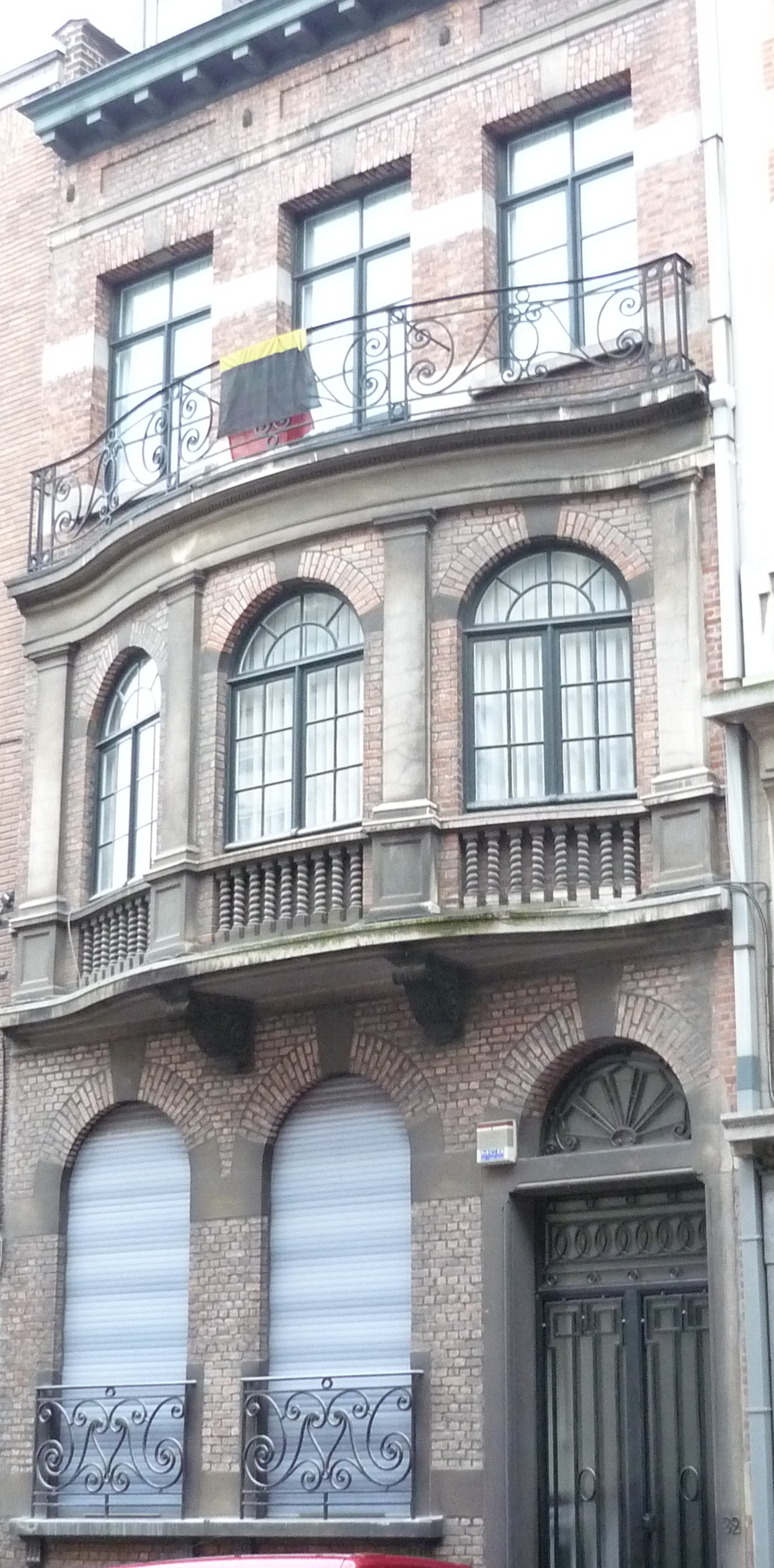
  1923 : Brussels, rue des Fabriques, 32, Beaux-arts style house.
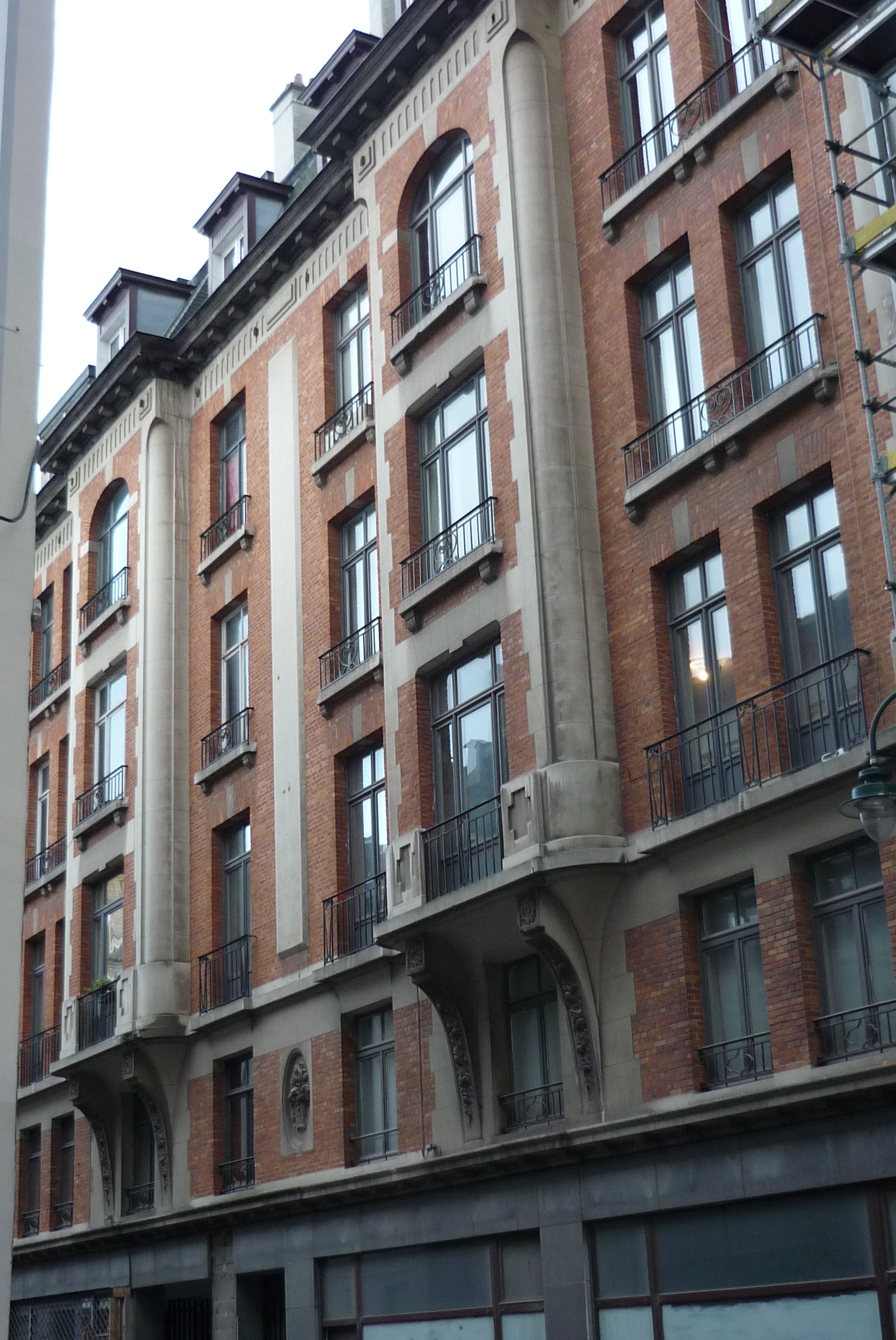
  1923 : Brussels, rue des Fabriques, 32A-36A, apartment building in Art Deco style.

== Honours ==
- Officer of the Order of the Crown
- Knight of the Order of Léopold (Military Division)
- Military Cross (First Class)
- Commemorative Medal of the reign of HM Léopold II

== Bibliography ==
- 1935: Histoire de l'École militaire, 1834-1934, Brussels, printer Marcel Hayez, 1935, p. 361.
- 1936: Bulletin de la Société Royale d'Archéologie de Bruxelles, 2 March 1936.
- 1993: Le patrimoine monumental de la Belgique, Brussels, Pentagone E-M, Brussels, Pierre Mardaga, editor, 1993, volume 1B, p. 41.
- 2003: Anne Van Loo (dir.), Dictionnaire de l'Architecture en Belgique de 1830 à nos jours, Antwerp, Fonds Mercator, 2003, p. 561.
