= Van Dievoet family =

Belgian family

Van Dievoet family van Dievoet, Vandivout, Vandive, Divutius
- Coat of arms
- Current region: Belgium
- Etymology: Sacred ford (See: Dievoort)
- Origin: Duchy of Brabant
- Founded: 17th century
- Founder: Gillis van Dievoet
- Traditions: Christianity
- Motto: Pes meus in directo.
- Estate: Château du Moisnil
- Branches: Vandive

The Van Dievoet family (/ˈdiːvʊt/) is a Belgian family originating from the Duchy of Brabant. It descends from the Seven Lineages of Brussels and its members have been bourgeois (freemen) of that city since the 1600s. It formed, at the end of the 17th century, a now extinct Parisian branch which used the name Vandive.

== Origins ==
This family descends from Gillis van Dievoet (d. before 1672), bourgeois of Brussels, who wed, in a first marriage on 13 November 1650, in the Chapel Church, Catharina Slachmeulder. And, in a second marriage on 31 July 1660, in Saint Gudula, Gertrudis Zeevaert.

== Brussels branch ==
The Brussels branch is the only extant branch of the Van Dievoet family. It has produced notable merchants, artists, architects, athletes, and executives, as well as prominent judges, lawyers and law historians.

=== Notable members ===
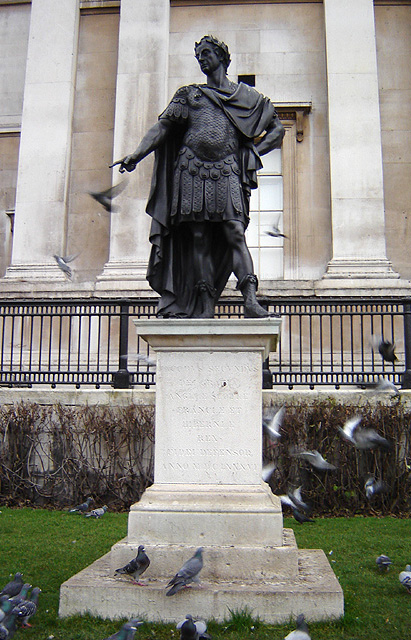
Statue of King James II in Trafalgar Square, London by Peter Van Dievoet and Laurens van der Meulen while they were working in Grinling Gibbons's London workshop. 1683.

- Peter van Dievoet (1661–1729), baroque and classicist sculptor active in London and Brussels, councillor to the city of Brussels.
- Pierre van Dievoet, musician (1781–1825).
- Jean-Louis van Dievoet [fr] (1777–1854), jurist and Secretary of the Belgian supreme court.
- Augustus van Dievoet (1803–1865), supreme court advocate and legal historian.

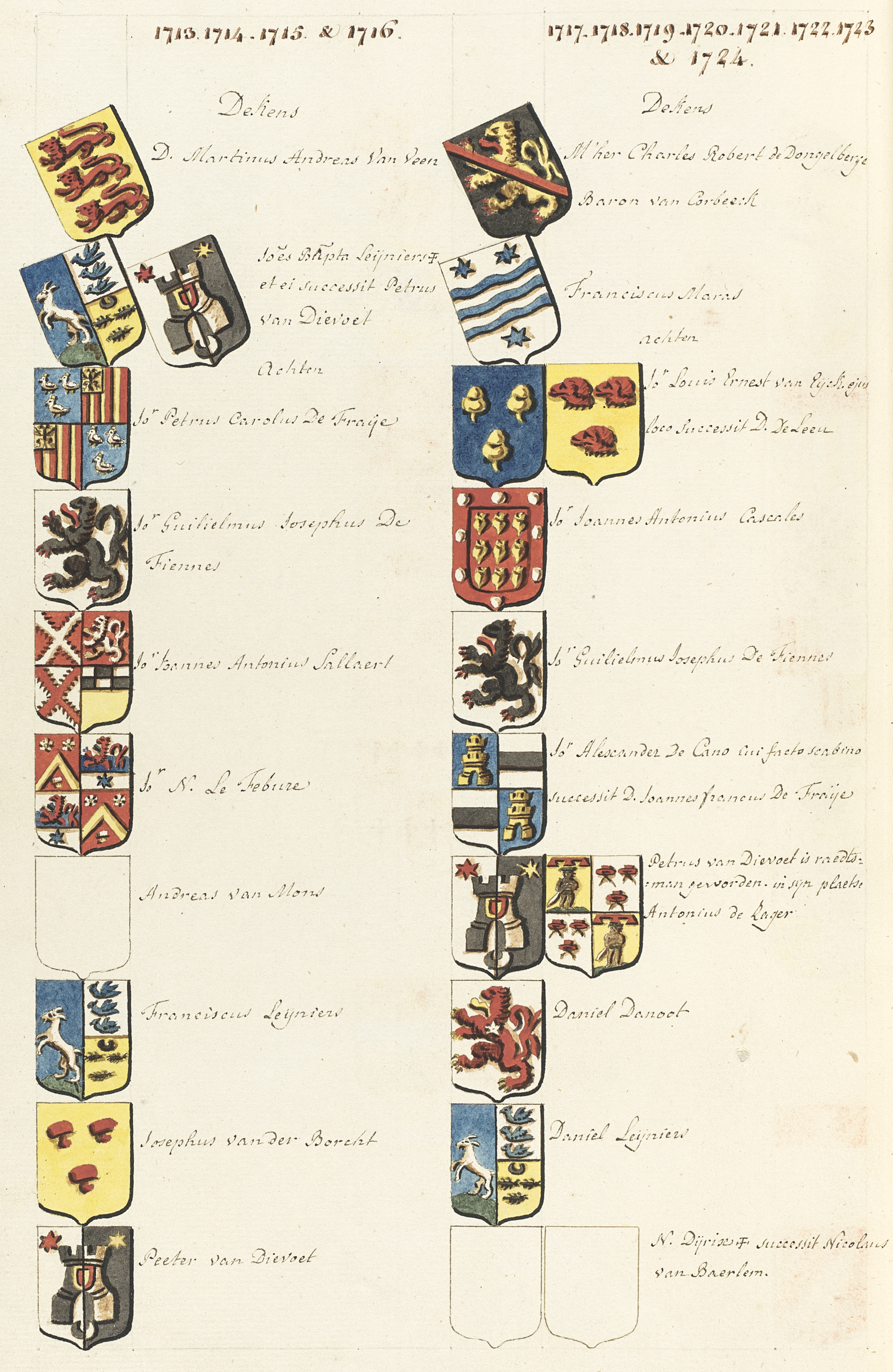
Coat of arms of Peter van Dievoet on the roll of arms of the Drapery Court of Brussels.

- Léon van Dievoet (1838–1908) ship-owner, associate of Lambert Straatman.
- Camille van Dievoet (1842–1931), agent of the National Bank of Belgium, Knight of the Order of Leopold, First Class Civic Cross, Commemorative Medal of the reign of Leopold II.
- Jules van Dievoet (1844–1917), supreme court advocate.
- Eugène van Dievoet II (1862–1937), architect, major (military engineering), Knight of the Order of Léopold (Military Division), Officer of the Order of the Crown, Commemorative Medal of the reign of Léopold II, Military Cross (First Class).
- Henri van Dievoet (1869–1931), architect.
- Gabriel van Dievoet (1875–1934), Art Nouveau artist.
- Édouard van Dievoet (1875–1961), doctor of law and political and administrative sciences, General Manager of the Compagnie Internationale des Wagons-Lits, Officer of the France's Legion of Honour, Knight of the Order of Leopold, Officer of the Order of the Crown.
- Georges van Dievoet (1876–1932), engineer, Knight of the Order of Leopold, delegate of the National Committee of the province of Namur during the Great War.
- Jules Édouard van Dievoet (1878–1941), lawyer at the Brussels Court of appeal. Knight of the Order of Leopold, Commemorative Medal of the 1914–1918 War and the Victory Medal 1914–1918.
- Albert van Dievoet (1886–1980), honorary director and general manager in Brussels of the Compagnie Internationale des Wagons-Lits (48 years of service), director of Thomas Cook & Sons, director of the Seven Noble Houses of Brussels organization, Officer of the Order of Léopold, Commander of the Order of Léopold II, Croix de guerre with bronze lion, Fire Cross 1914–1918, Victory Medal 1914–1918, Officer of the France's Legion of Honour, Commander of the Royal Order of Merit of Bulgaria, Commander of the Order of Adolphe of Nassau.
- Paul van Dievoet (1896–1947), architect of the municipality of Schaerbeek.
- Germaine van Dievoet, (1899–1990), competitive swimmer, Bronze medal of the Sporting Merit, participated in the 1920 Antwerp Summer Olympics.
- Pierre van Dievoet (1904–1982), engineer, Knight of the Order of Leopold, captain of the Resistance, member of the Secret Army, Brumagne Squadron, Deputy Chief of Staff of Zone III of the Secret Army (Flanders).
- Léon van Dievoet II (1907–1993), architect, Knight of the Orders of Leopold and Crown.
- Jean-Paul van Dievoet (1928–2005), civil, electrical, mechanical, and naval engineer, Director General of the Belgonucléaire S.A., Pres. of Transnubel, VP of INB (Kalkar), Pres. of the Belgian Nuclear Society, VP of the Committee for Nuclear development and the Fuel Cycle of OECD-NEA, 1st Chairman and Honorary Fellow of the European Nuclear Society, Officer of the Order of Leopold.
- Florence van Dievoet née Descampe (b. 1969), veteran professional golfer.
- Ariane van Dievoet (b. 1988), interior architect, minimalist furniture and product designer, founder of design studio Avandi in Brooklyn in 2011.

== Parisian branch ==
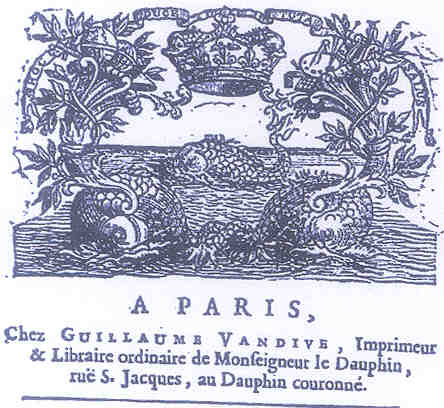
Typographic mark of Guillaume van Dievoet called Vandive, book printer of Monseigneur the Grand Dauphin, with his motto : "HOC DUCE TUTA SALUS", 1704.

The Parisian branch of the family, which used the name Vandive, descends from Philippe and produced notable goldsmiths and councillors to the Kings of France as well as a notable printer. It became extinct in 1802.

=== Notable members ===
- Philippe van Dievoet called Vandive, écuyer (1654–1738), councillor to the king, goldsmith of Louis XIV and consul of Paris.
- Guillaume Vandive, (1680–1706), printer of the Dauphin.
- Balthazar Philippe Vandive, goldsmith and consul of Paris
- Nicolas Félix Vandive, écuyer, lawyer at the Parlement of Paris, Clerk of the Hearing at the King's Council, Secretary-Advisor to King House and Crown of France.

== Portrait gallery ==
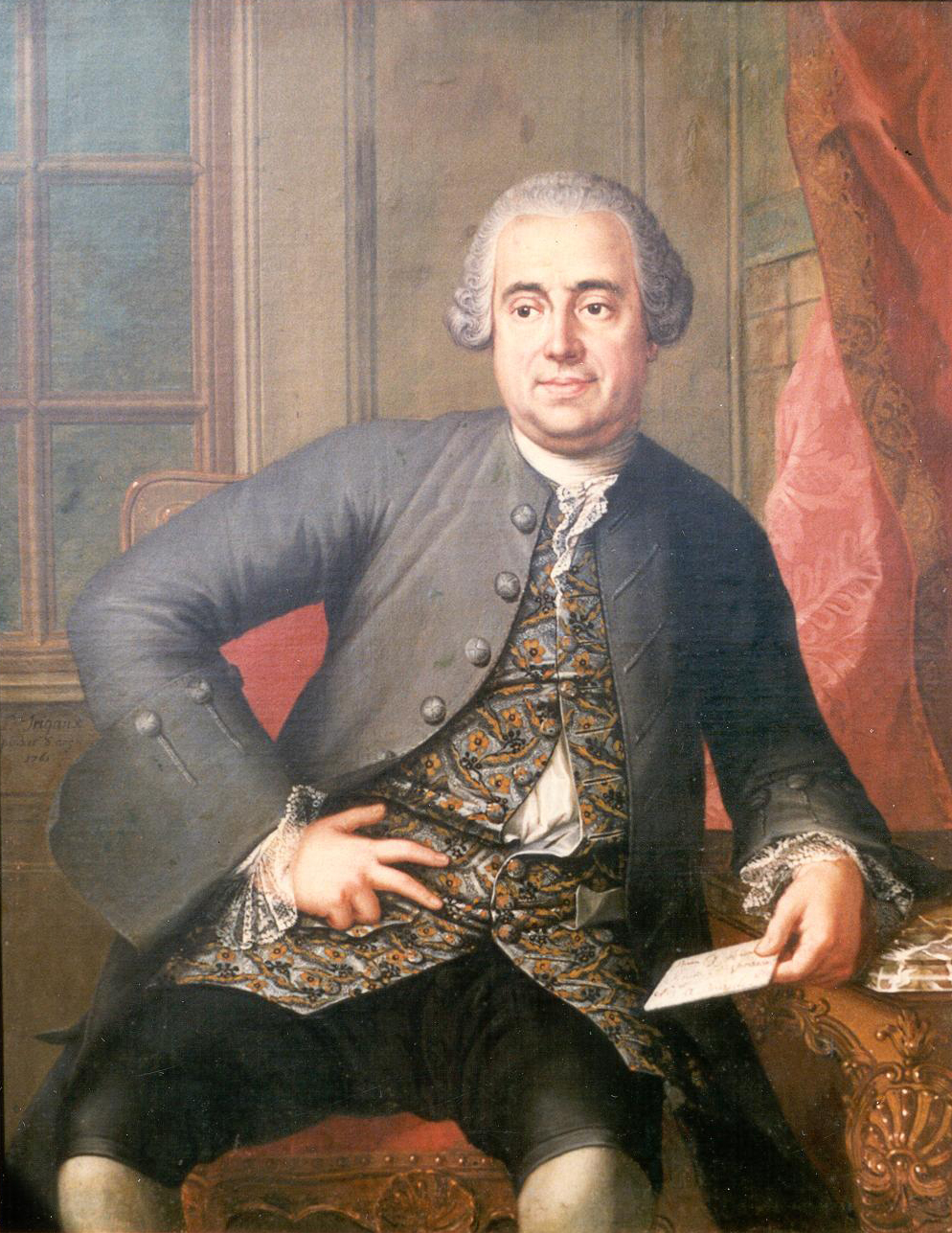
Jean-Baptiste van Dievoet II (1704–1776) husband of Elisabeth van der Meulen, portrait by Trigaux, 1761.

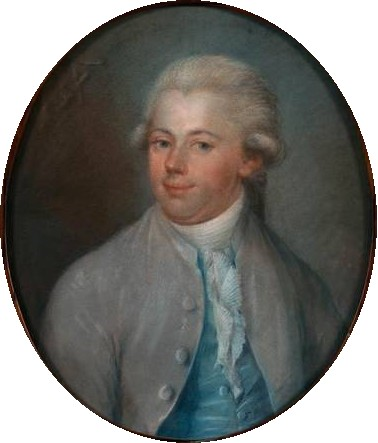
Jean-Baptiste van Dievoet III (1747–1821), husband of Anne-Marie Lambrechts (pastel 1774)

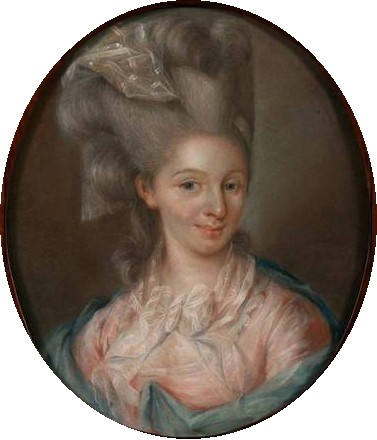
Anne-Marie Lambrechts (1753–1781), wife of Jean-Baptiste III van Dievoet (1753–1781) (pastel 1774)

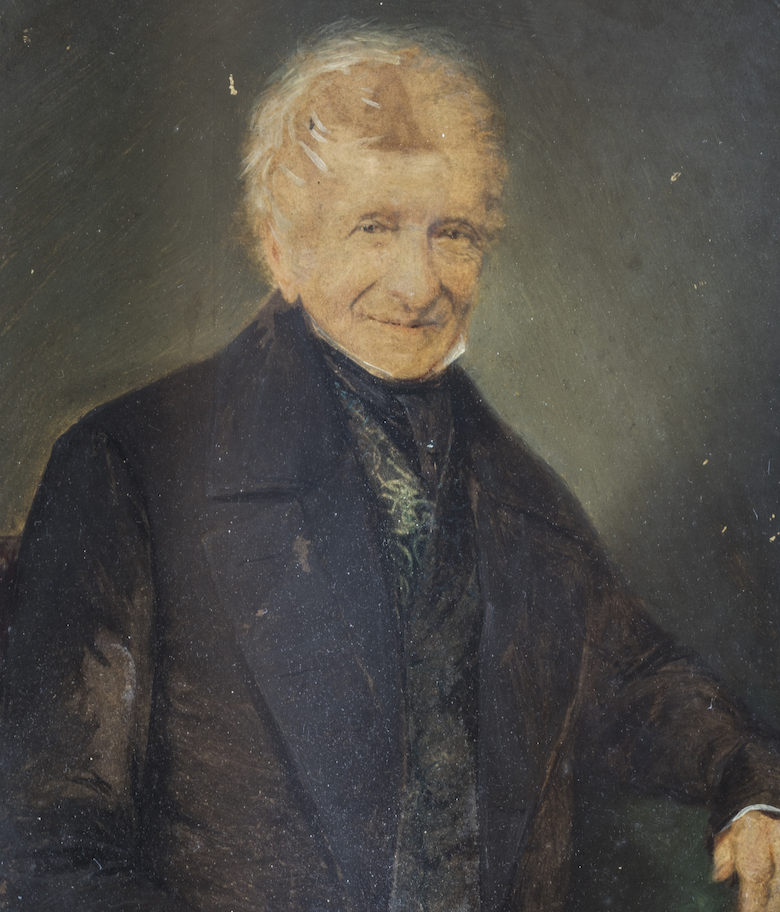
Jean-Baptiste van Dievoet IV, JUL (Juris Utriusque Licentiatus) (1775–1862), husband of Catherine-Jeanne Cuerens (1781–1823), father of Hortense van Dievoet (1804–1854). (1856)

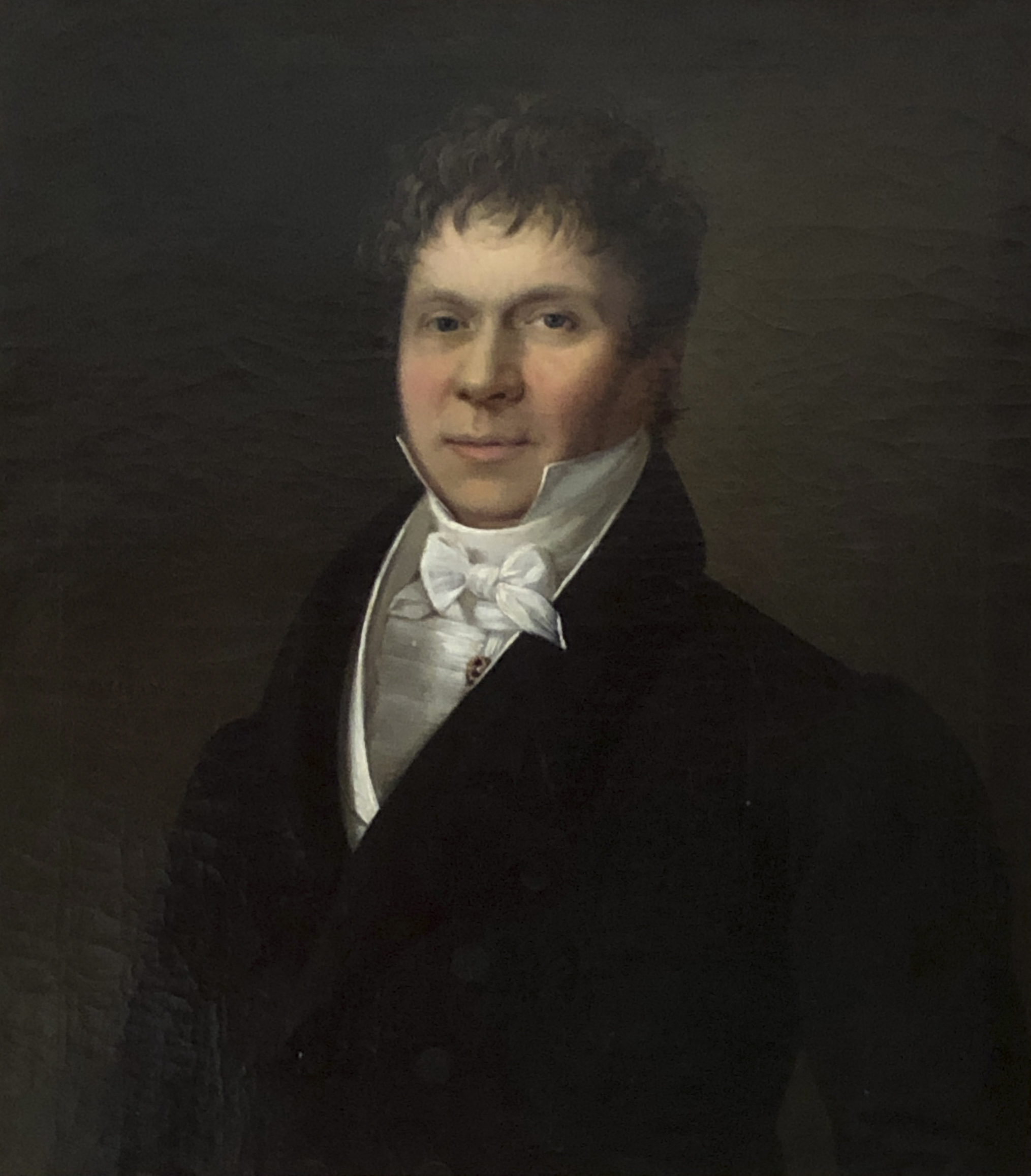
Jean-Louis van Dievoet [fr] (1777–1854), Secretary of the Belgian Supreme Court, husband of Jeanne Wittouck (portrait by Ignace Brice)

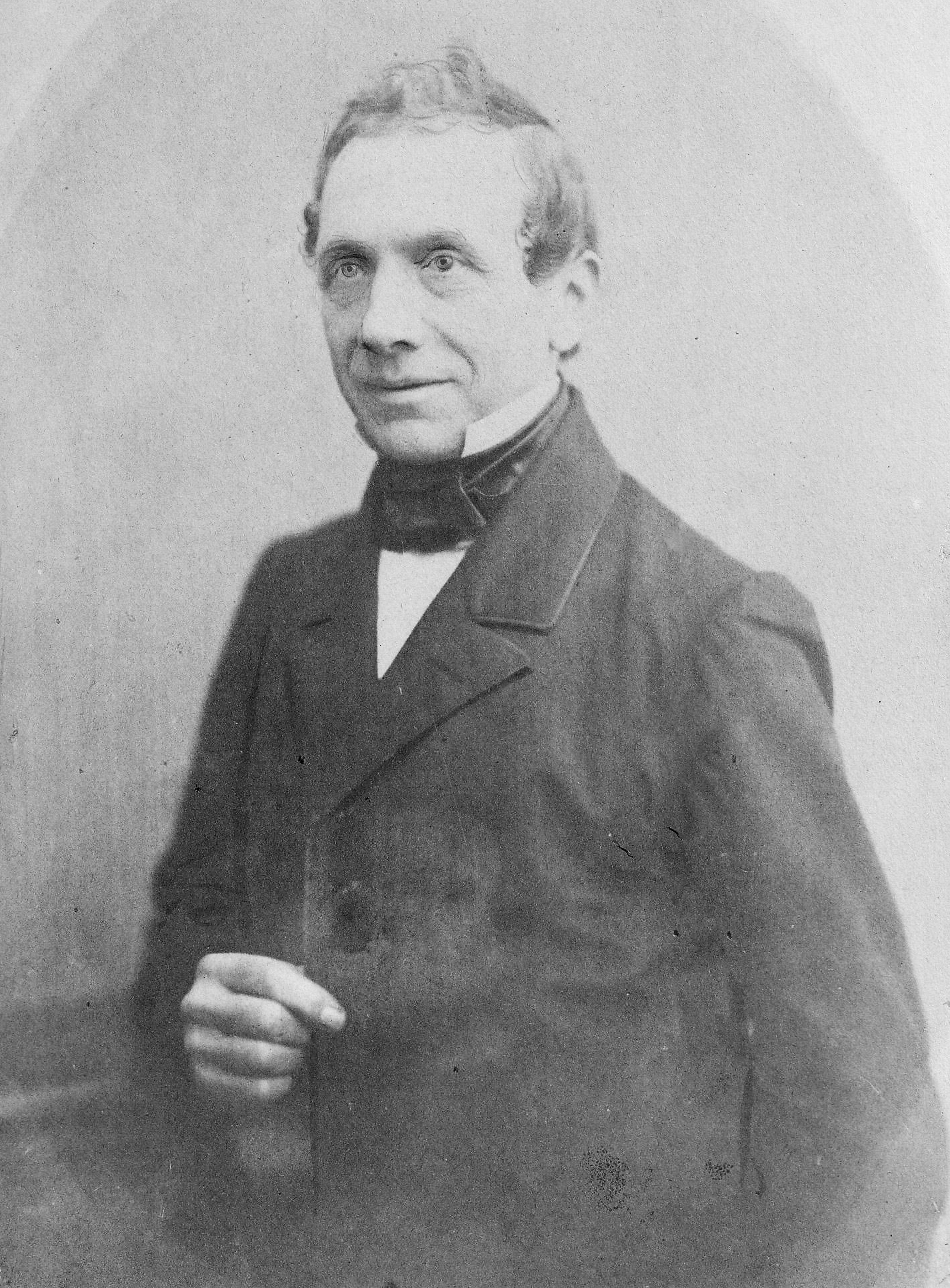
Auguste van Dievoet (1803–1865), legal historian and Supreme Court advocate.

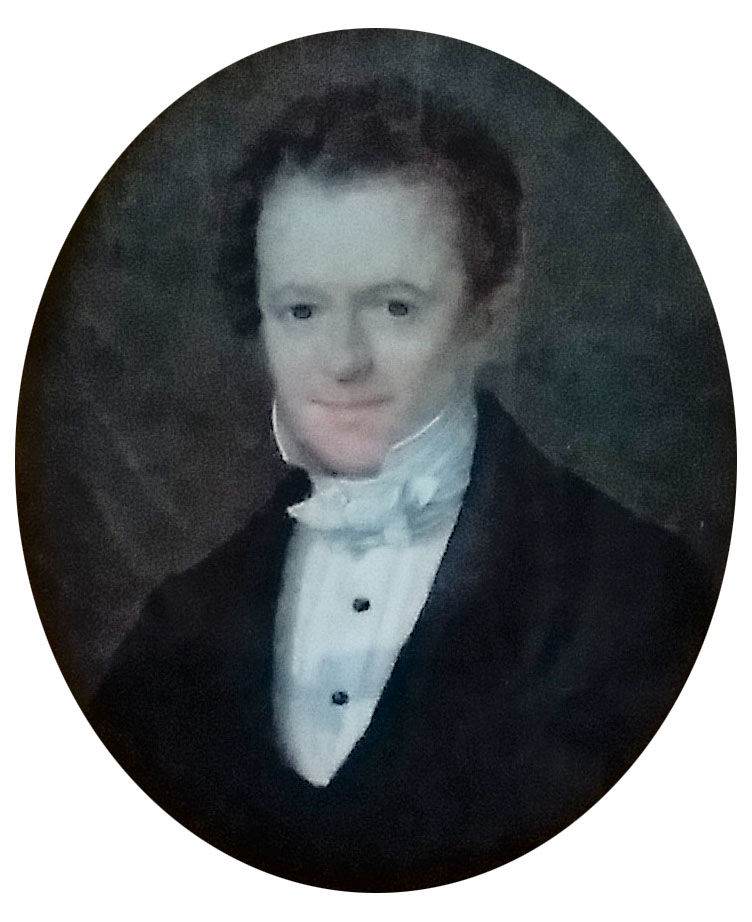
Eugène van Dievoet I (1804–1858), portrait miniature circa 1854.

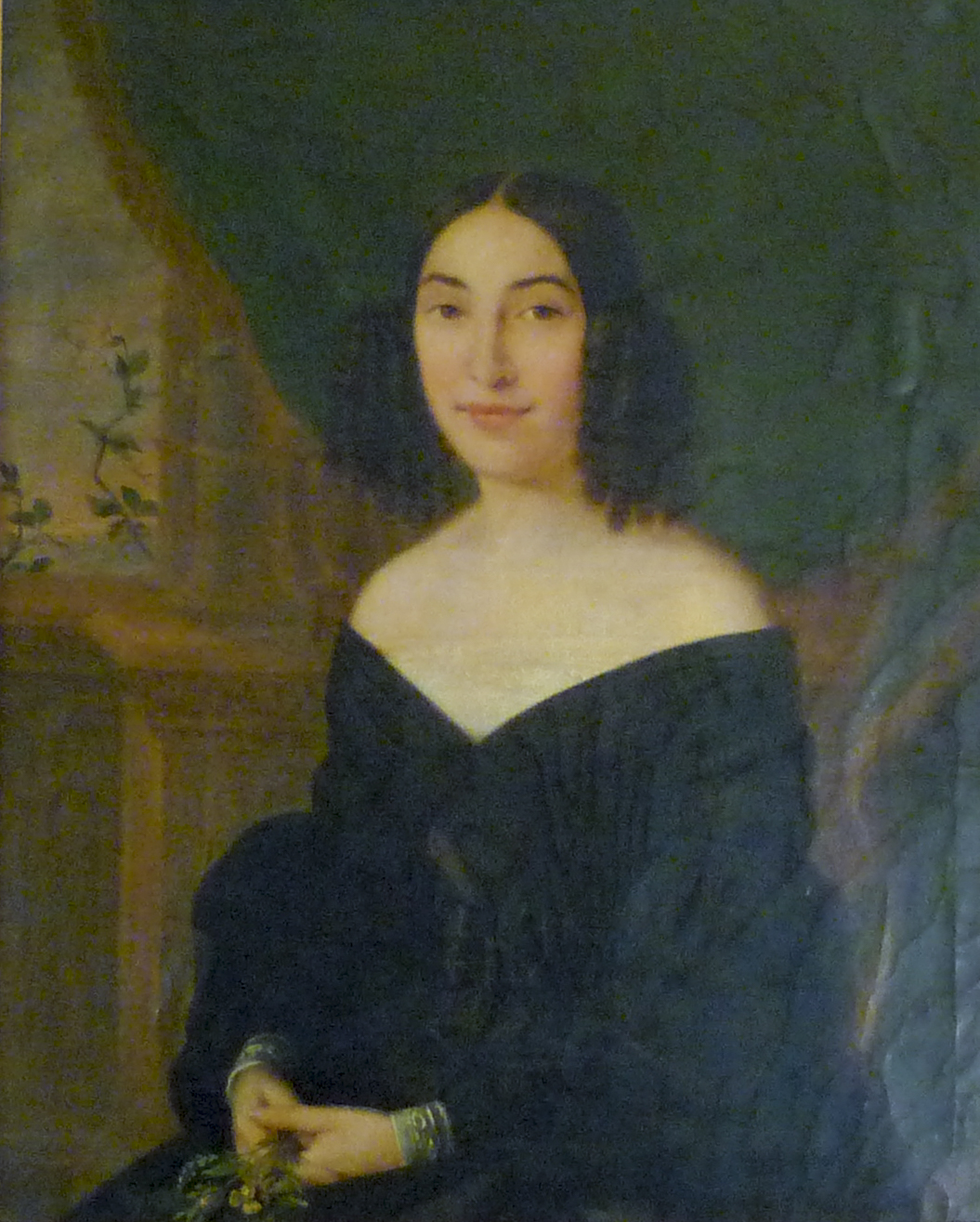
Hortense Poelaert (1815–1900), wife of Eugène van Dievoet I (1804–1858), sister of the architect Joseph Poelaert (portrait by Ignace Brice, 1840).

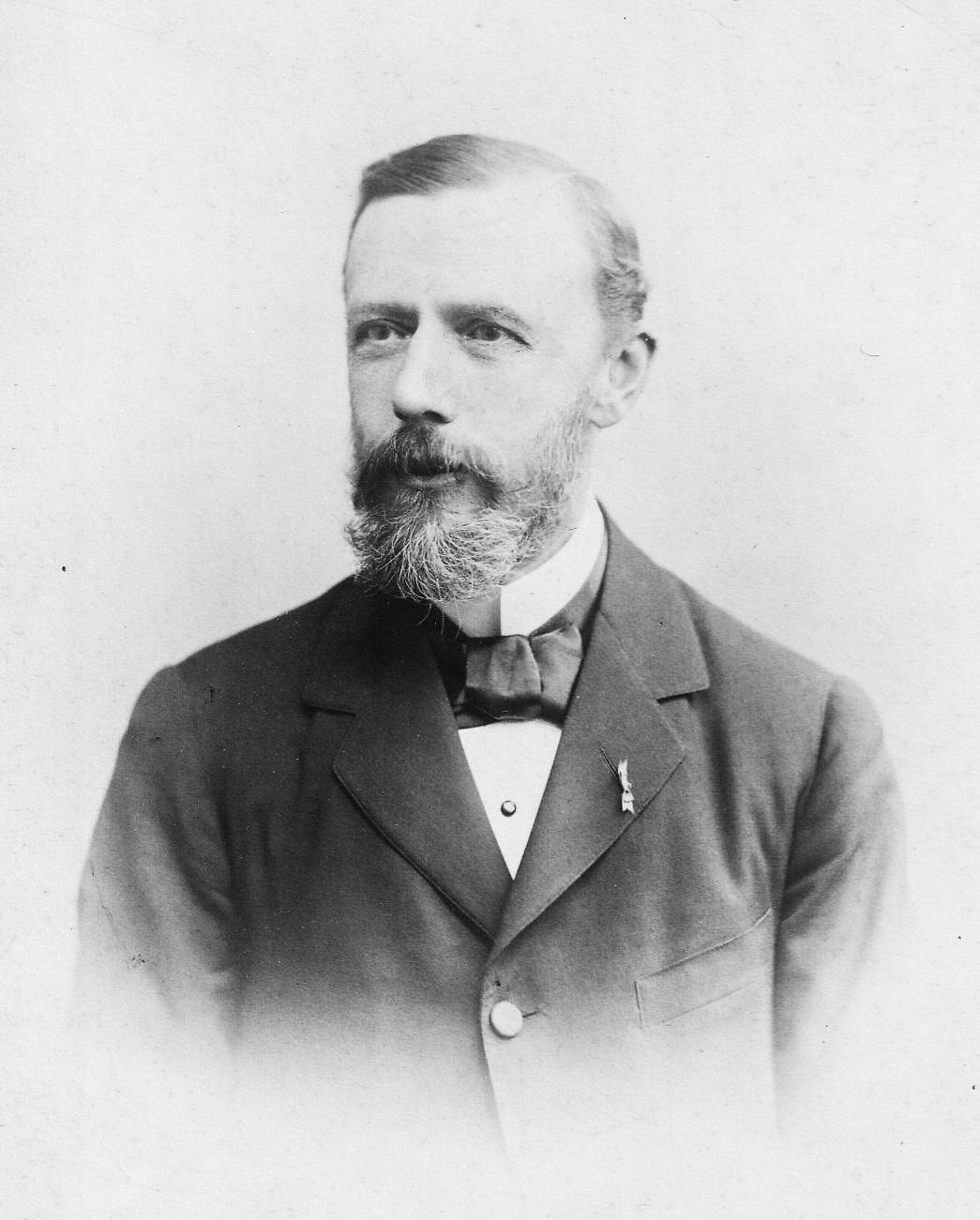
Jules van Dievoet (1844–1917), Supreme Court advocate.

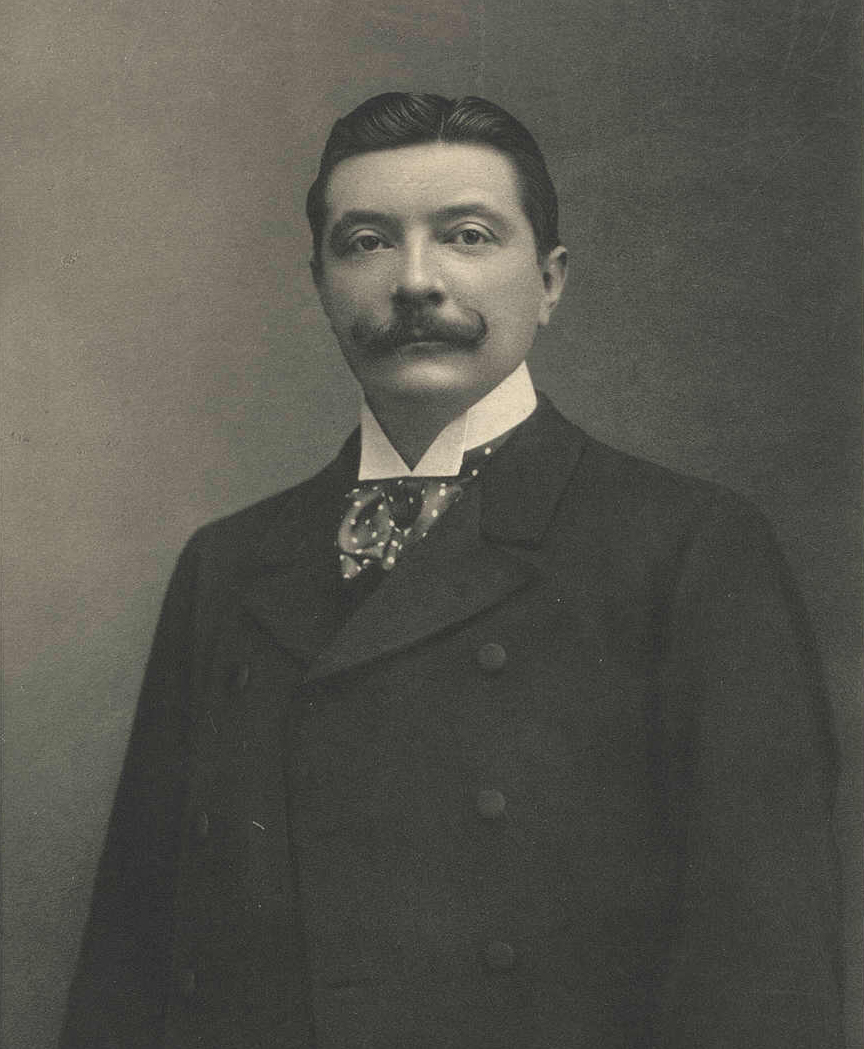
Henri van Dievoet (1869–1931), architect, husband of Eugénie Masson (1872–1943).

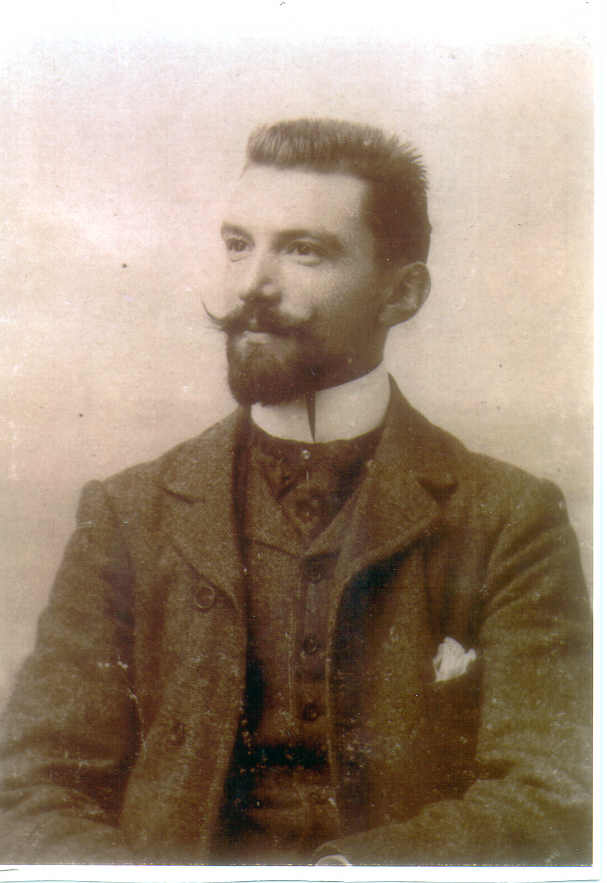
Gabriel van Dievoet (1875–1934), decorator and sgraffitist.

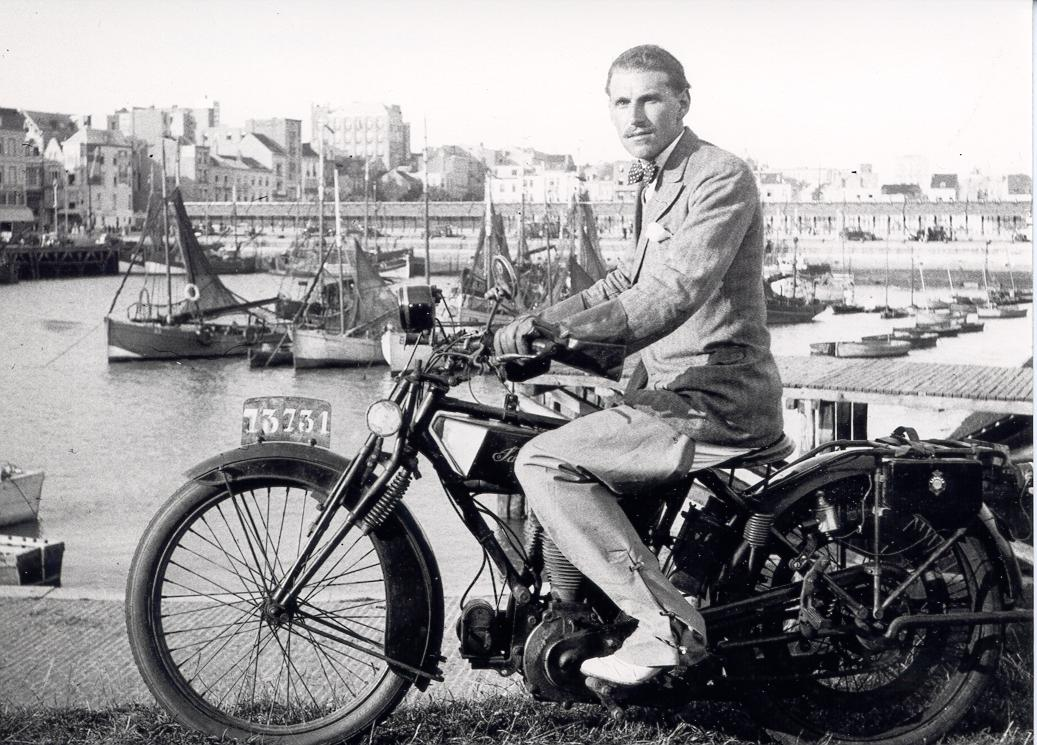
Léon van Dievoet (1907–1993), architect and painter.

== Heraldry ==
Coat of arms of the Van Dievoet family
Notes These canting arms were first documented in the confirmation of familial arms that, on 14 October 1698, was delivered to Jean-Baptiste van Dievoet, husband of Anne van der Borcht, by Joseph van den Leene (1654–1742), First King of Arms of the Spanish Netherlands and the Duchy of Burgundy. Granted 1698 by the King of Arms Joseph van den Leene; 2021 by the Council of Heraldry and Vexillology Crest a demi wyvern Sable armed and langued Gules Escutcheon Per pale Argent and Sable, on a tower embattled of four merlons counterchanged and gated of the field between in chief two mullets of six-points Gules and Or and in base a crescent counterchanged, an escutcheon per pale Or and Gules charged with a dexter human foot sole counterchanged. Motto Pes meus in directo. Other versions Coat of arms of Peter van Dievoet, brother of Jean-Baptiste, recorded in 1713 in the roll of arms of the Drapery Court of Brussels

== Genealogy ==
Simplified family tree
Gillis van Dievoet († before 1672) x Catharina Slachmeulder
  - Philippe van Dievoet called Vandive (1654–1738) x Anne Martinot
    - Vandive family
- Gillis van Dievoet († before 1672) x Gertrudis Zeevaert
  - Peter van Dievoet (1661–1729) x Dorothea de Witte
  - Jean-Baptiste van Dievoet I(1663–1751) x Anne van der Borcht
    - Jean-Baptiste van Dievoet II (1704–1776) x Élisabeth van der Meulen
      - Jean-Baptiste van Dievoet III (1747–1821) x Anne-Marie Lambrechts
        - Jean-Baptiste van Dievoet IV (1775–1862), JUL x Catherine-Jeanne Cuerens
        - Jean-Louis van Dievoet (fr) (1777–1854) x Jeanne Wittouck
          - Augustus van Dievoet (1803–1865) x Antoinette Coniart
            - Jules van Dievoet (1844–1917) x Marguerite Anspach
              - Jules Édouard van Dievoet (1878–1941) x Marguerite Leclercq
          - Eugène van Dievoet I (1804–1858) x Hortense Poelaert
            - Ernest Jean-Louis Van Dievoet (1835–1903) x Léonie Joséphine Françoise Most
              - Eugène Van Dievoet II (1862–1937) x Léonie Caroline Catherine Quarez
            - Léon Philippe van Dievoet (1838–1908) x Hermine Straatman
              - Henri van Dievoet (1869–1931) x Eugenie Masson
                - Paul van Dievoet (1896–1947)
                - Germaine van Dievoet (1899–1990) x Willy Dessecker
              - Gabriel van Dievoet (1875–1934) x Alice Demets
                - Léon van Dievoet II (1907–1993) x Madeleine Vande Weyer
            - Camille Van Dievoet (1842–1931) x Lucie Sancke
              - Albert van Dievoet (1886–1980) x Anne François

== See also ==
- Belgian Resistance
- Bourgeois of Brussels
- Bourgeois of Paris
- Château du Moisnil
- Guillaume Delcourt
- Dievoet, for other families with the same surname
- Dievoort, a surname of the same etymology
- Drapery Court of Brussels
- Guilds of Brussels
- Secret Army
- Société des douze
- Rue du Marché aux Fromages
- List of Legion of Honour recipients by name (V)
