= Charles Maximilien de Lalaing =

Belgian diplomat

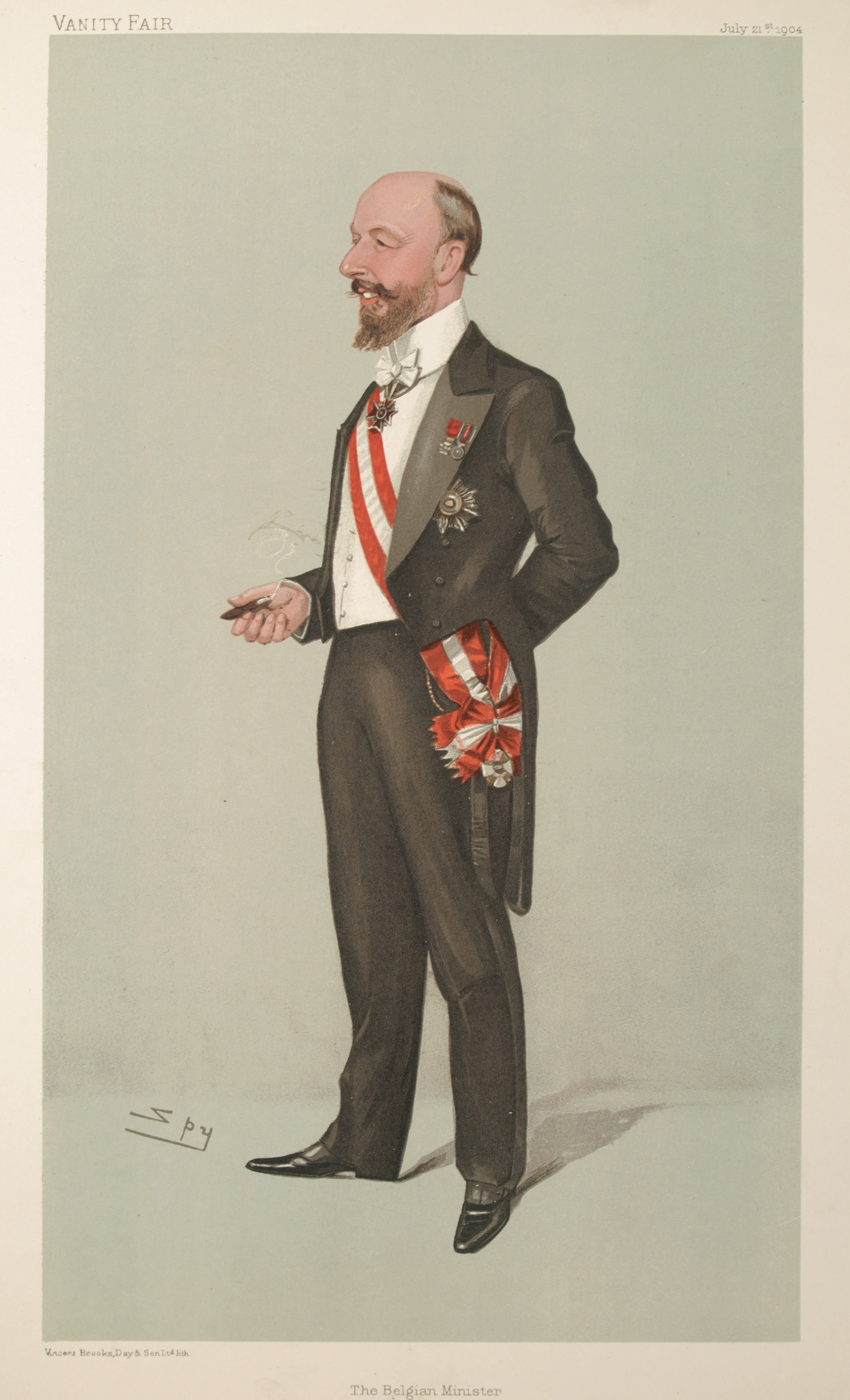
Charles Maximilien de Lalaing in 1904.

Charles Maximilien, Count de Lalaing (1856–1919) was a Belgian diplomat.

== Family ==
De Lalaing was born in London, but belonged to the Belgian Lalaing family; his father was count Maximilien III de Lalaing (1811–1881) and his brother, Jacques, became a celebrated artist. He was married to Christine du Tour de Bellinchove (1866–1919), daughter of Marc Willem du Tour de Bellinchove. Their son, Jacques III de Lalaing (1889–1969), followed the career of his father.

== Career ==
De Lalaing was an ambassador to Switzerland (1899–1903), Romania (1896–1899) and Brasil (1893–1896). He was sent to the coronation of King George V. He served in the United Kingdom from 1904 to 1917, during the First World war. He died after a long illness and was buried in an Anglican service in Brussels.

== Honours ==
- Kingdom of Belgium:
  - Commander of the Order of Leopold.
  - Knight Grand cross in the Order of the Crown
  - Commemorative Medal of the Reign of King Leopold II
- United Kingdom:
  - Knight grand Cross in the Royal Victorian Order
  - George V Coronation medal
- Kingdom of Italy: Knight grand Cross in the Order of the Crown of Italy
- Kingdom of Romania: Knight grand Cross in the Order of the Star of Romania
- Officer of the Imperial Order of the Rising Sun
- Knight of the Order of the Netherlands Lion
