= Rue du Marché aux Fromages =

Street in Brussels, Belgium

Rue du Marché aux Fromages (French); Kaasmarkt (Dutch)
- Rue des Pittas (French); Pitastraat (Dutch)
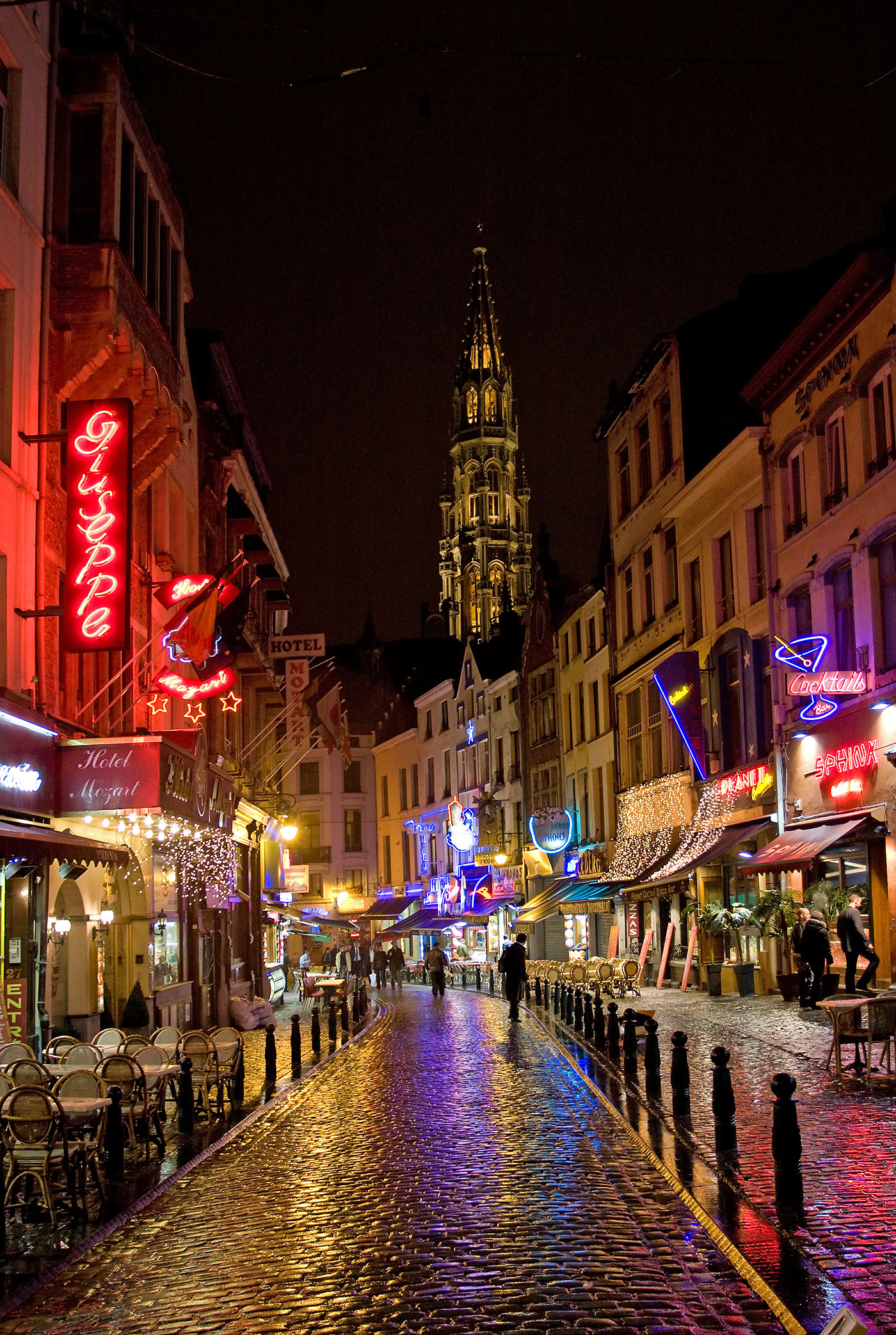
- The spire of Brussels' Town Hall seen from the Rue du Marché aux Fromages/Kaasmarkt

- Location within Brussels Location within Belgium
- Type: Street
- Location: City of Brussels, Brussels-Capital Region, Belgium
- Postal code: 1000
- Coordinates: 50°50′45″N 04°21′11″E

The Rue du Marché aux Fromages (French, pronounced [ʁy dy maʁ.ʃe o fʁɔ.maʒ]) or Kaasmarkt (Dutch), meaning "Cheese Market Street", now also known by its nickname the Rue des Pittas or Pitastraat ("Pitta Street"), is a historic street in central Brussels, Belgium, near the Grand-Place/Grote Markt (Brussels' main square). It is lined with numerous pitta bars, pizzerias and cocktail bars.

Two blind alleys come from this street: the Impasse du Dragon/Draeckengang (currently the Impasse de la Poupée/Poppegang), and the Impasse du Poivre/Pepergang (now called the Impasse de la Cuve/Kuipgang).

== Toponymy ==
The Rue du Marché aux Fromages/Kaasmarkt ("Cheese Market Street") used to be called the Smaelbeek in the 13th century. Then, it was renamed the Rue du Cercueil/Kistenstraat ("Coffin Street") before being changed back to its current name. It is today sometimes known under the moniker the Rue des Pitta/Pitastraat ("Pitta Street") due to the Greek restaurants found along it.

== History ==
Until the 16th century, cheese, onions and figs were traded on an open-air marketplace called the Caesmerct (meaning "Cheese Market" in Old Dutch). The oldest place-name would have been Smaelbeek (1234), after the artificial stream which, according to historians, flowed there. Nowadays, it thought to be more likely that the stream ran through the block between the Rue du Marché aux Fromages and the Rue de la Violette/Violetstraat and that the Smaelbeek referred to the latter street.

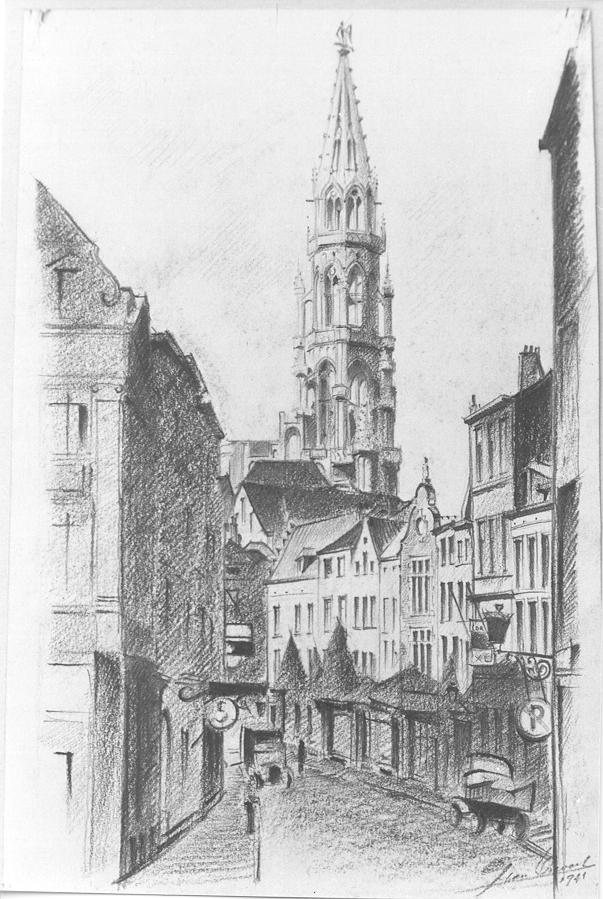
Drawing of the Rue du Marché aux Fromages, by Léon van Dievoet, 1941

The market stalls apparently hindered the shops on the street. In 1509, the authorities had posts with the Burgundian Cross placed to limit their space. In 1615, butchers were allowed to participate in the market, with fines being imposed as a precaution against insults or fights. Carpenters and wood turners took over in the 18th century. Their chairs, ladders and coffins on display gave the street all kinds of nicknames, such as Leerestroet and Kistenstroet. The latter name was still in use in 1900, long after the coffins had been banned from the street.

In the 1970s, the street did not have a great reputation, with quite a few nightclubs and drugs. Greek immigrants brought about a revival by opening pitta bars, a concept that Belgians were completely unfamiliar with at the time. The first was Athens in 1979. By cooping up together, they were better able to attract the attention of tourists. In the 1990s, they invested in visual Hellenisation of the street. In order to respect the rules of the UNESCO zone, all neon signs, signboards, columns and caryatids were removed in 2012.

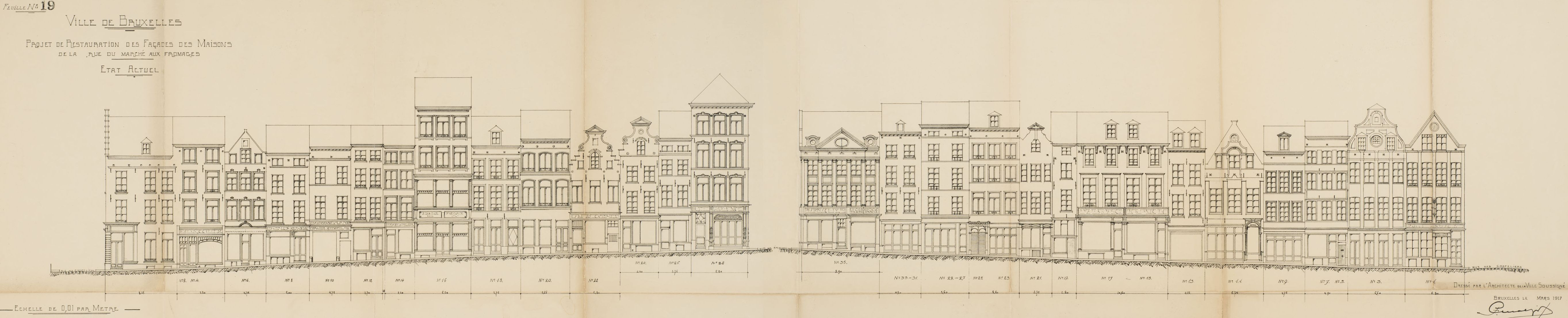
Restoration project by the City of Brussels (current state), 1917

== Notable houses ==
The street has many preserved old houses, most of which were rebuilt after the bombardment of Brussels in 1695. Some underwent major changes in the 19th century but without losing their original appearance. Notable examples include:

- Au Cheval Marin or Zeepeerd ("The Seahorse"). Currently no. 1, at the corner of the Rue des Chapeliers/Hoedenmakersstraat. It has a door framing in the Louis XV style.
- Aux Troix Pages or Drij Pagekens ("The Three Pages"). Currently no. 5–7. It featured a façade that was recently stripped.
- Au Dragon de Fer or Den Eijseren Draeck ("The Iron Dragon"). Currently no. 15–17. Large house built in 1709 for Jean-Baptiste van Dievoet (1663–1751) and located on the right of the Impasse du Dragon. In the 18th century, its ground floor featured woodwork with recessed paintings and gilded leathers in the front room towards the street. On the façade hung an iron dragon as an ensign. The ground floor was totally transformed in 1882 into two commercial storefronts. This house's name finds its origin into the oldest history of Brussels since, according to legend, it is located at the same place where Saint Gaugericus defeated the dragon that was sowing terror on the territory that would become Brussels, and whose lair was located at this location near the Smaelbeek stream.
- No. 19: Considered the smallest house of Brussels, where the Impasse du Dragon starts.
- Au Chat or De Kat. Currently no. 35, at the corner of the Rue des Éperonniers/Spoormakersstraat where it is no. 43. Built in 1697.
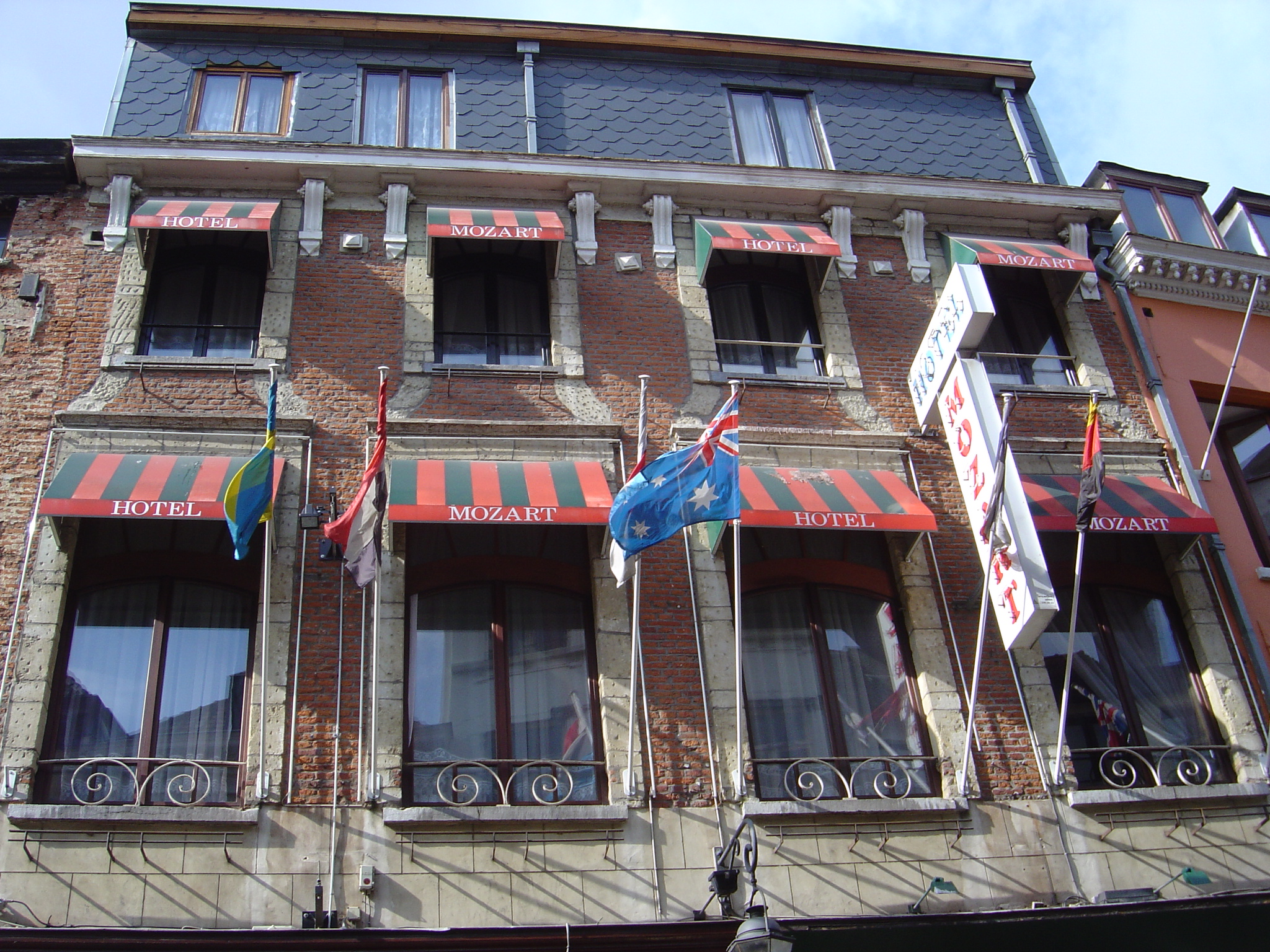
Au Dragon de Fer or Den Eijseren Draeck (Van Dievoet, 1709)

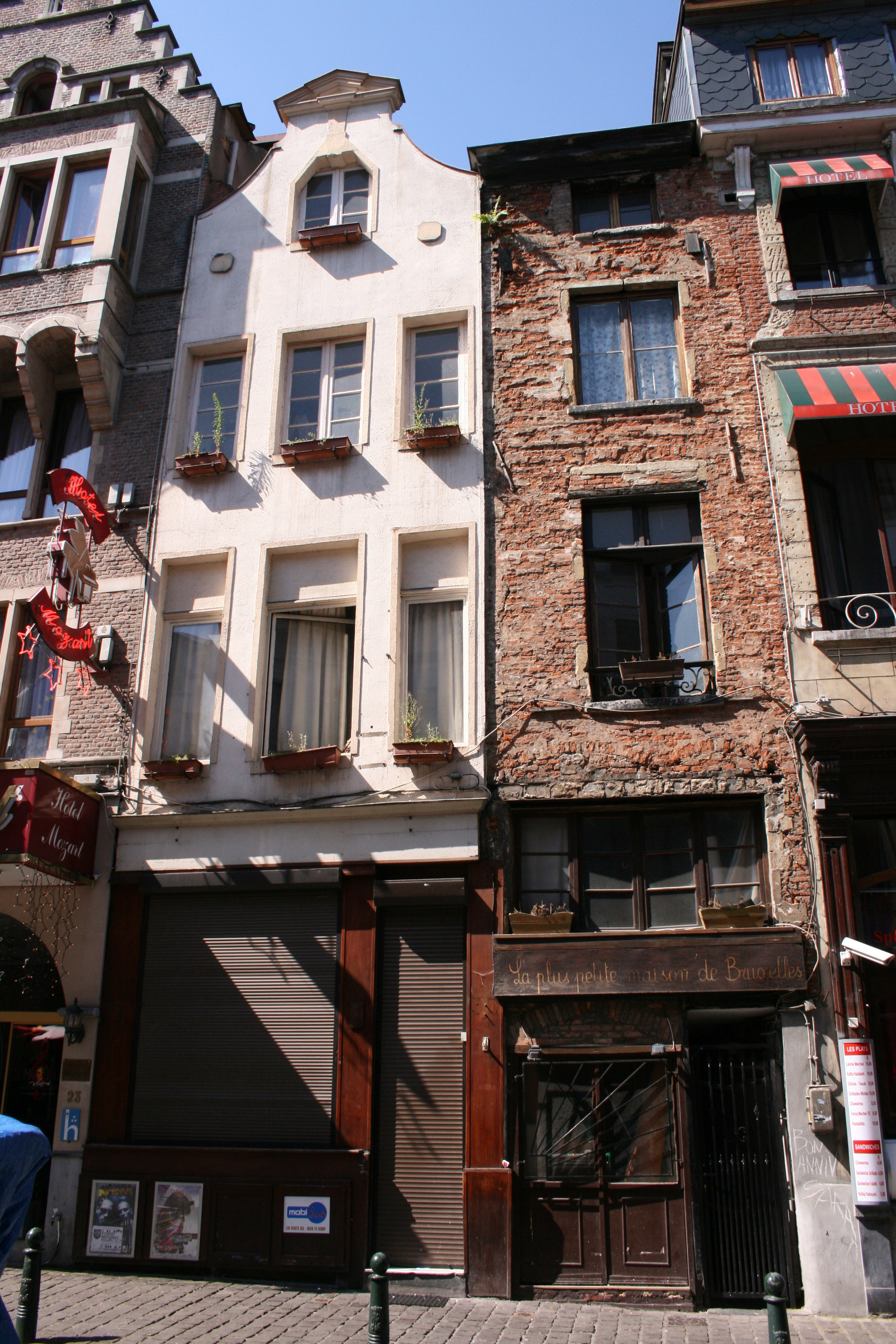
No. 19 (on the right), entrance to the Impasse du Dragon

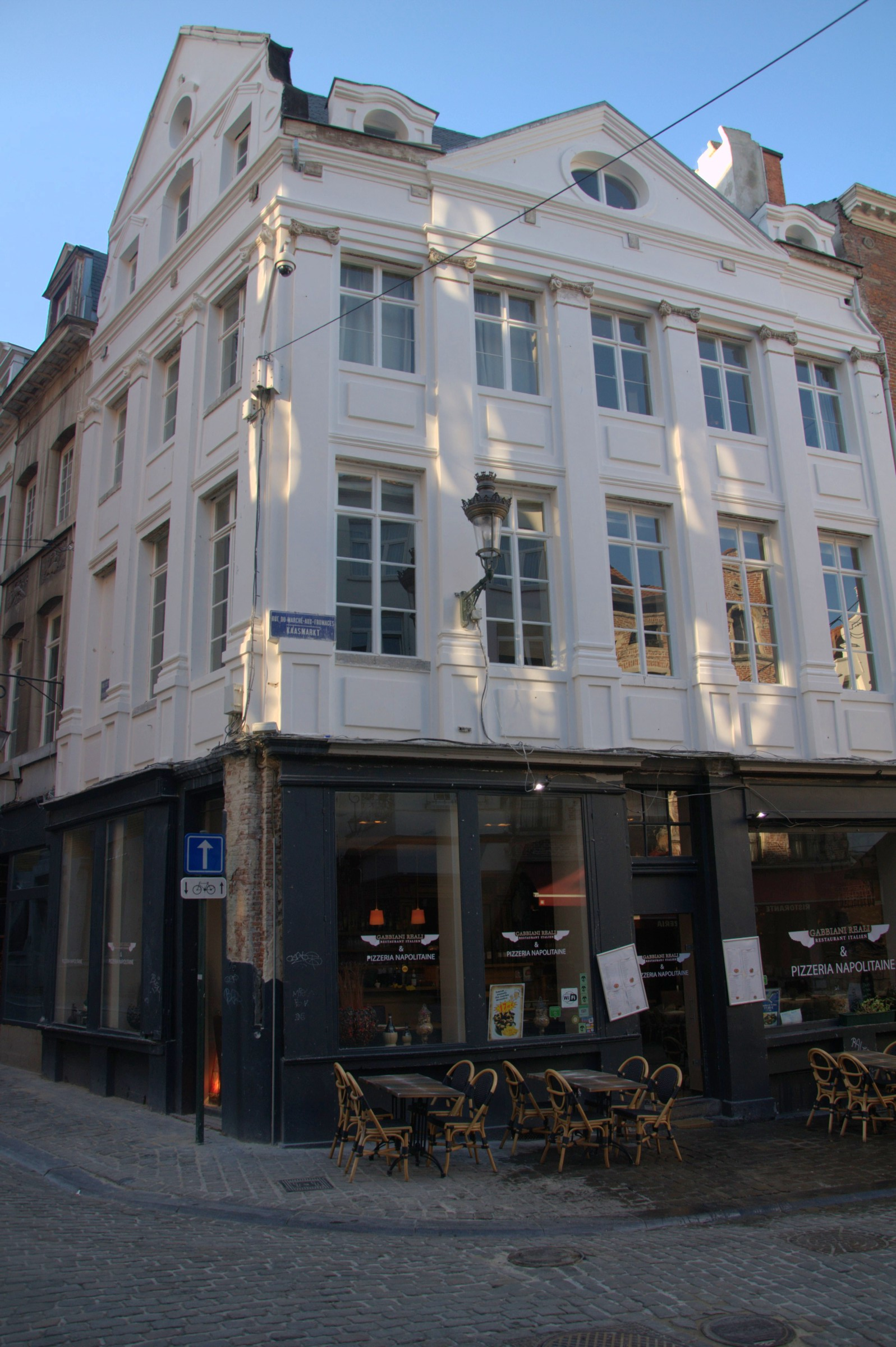
Au Chat or De Kat (1697)

== See also ==
- List of streets in Brussels
- History of Brussels
- Belgium in the long nineteenth century
