= Joseph van den Leene =

King of arms of the Spanish Netherlands (1654–1742)

Coat of arms of Joseph van den Leene.

Joseph van den Leene (12 August 1654 – 16 February 1742), lord of Lodinsart, Castillon, and Huyseghem, was the First King of Arms of the Spanish Netherlands, and the Duchy of Burgundy, this office was called Toison d'Or. On 13 June 1678, he was admitted to the House of Serhuyghs of the Seven Noble Houses of Brussels.
