= Gabriel Van Dievoet =

Belgian decorator (1875–1934)

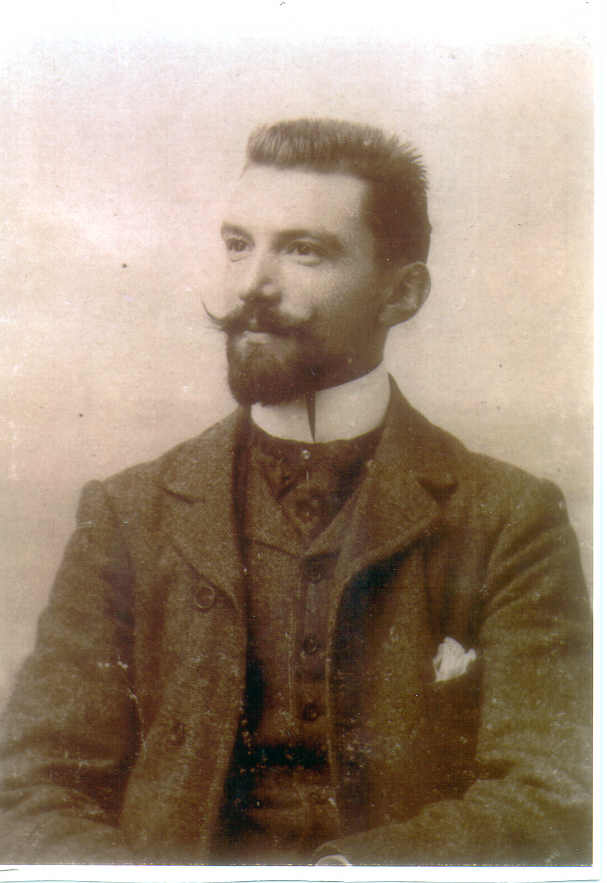
- Born: 12 April 1875; Brussels
- Died: 17 November 1934 (aged 59); Saint-Gilles
- Education: Académie Royale des Beaux-Arts
- Occupation: Artist
- Children: Léon van Dievoet
- Parent(s): Léon van Dievoet and Hermine Straatman
- Family: Van Dievoet family

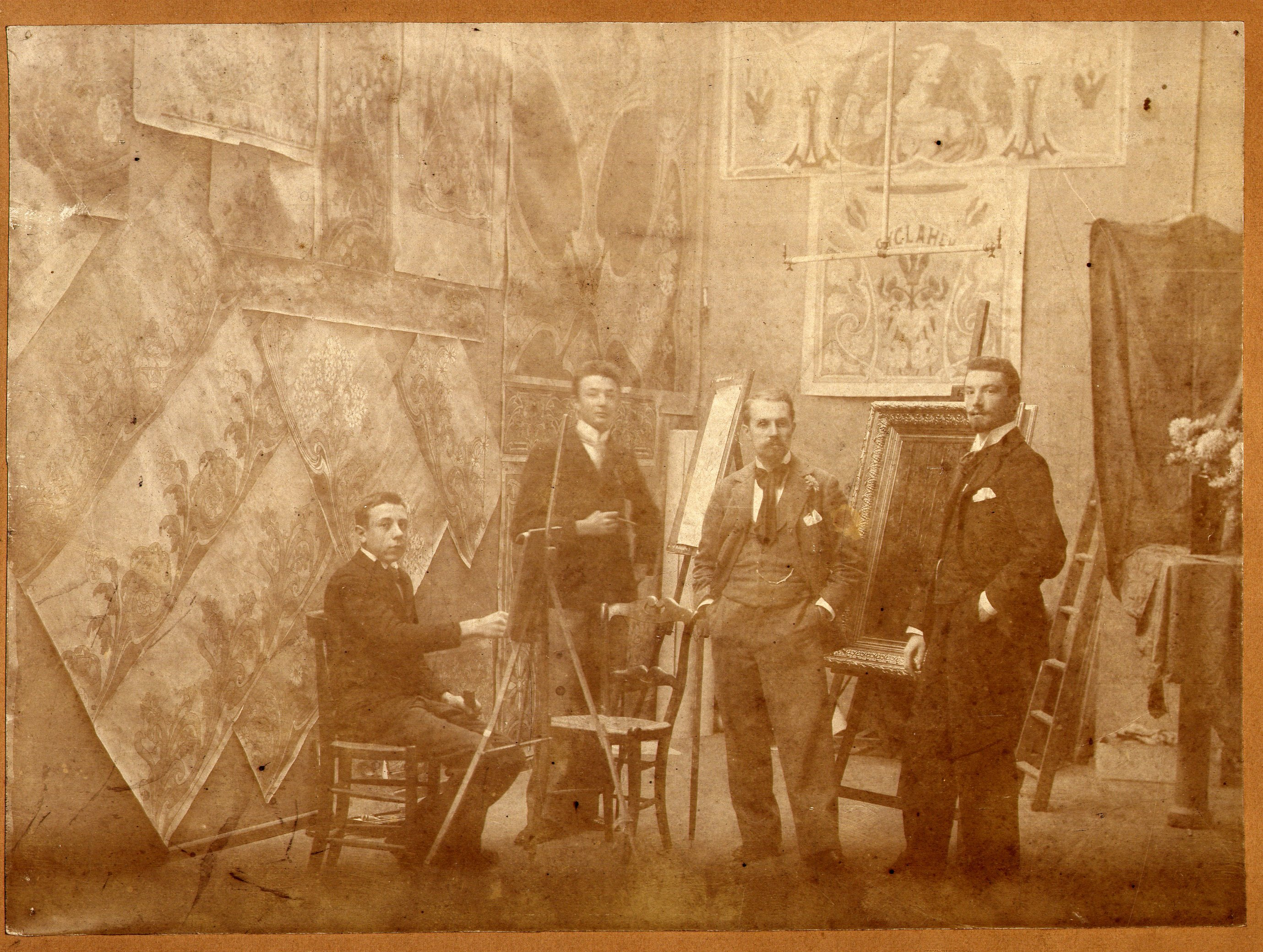
Gabriel Van Dievoet (right) in his atelier at 71, rue Faider Ixelles, with Leon Van Cutsem and two apprentices, 1895.

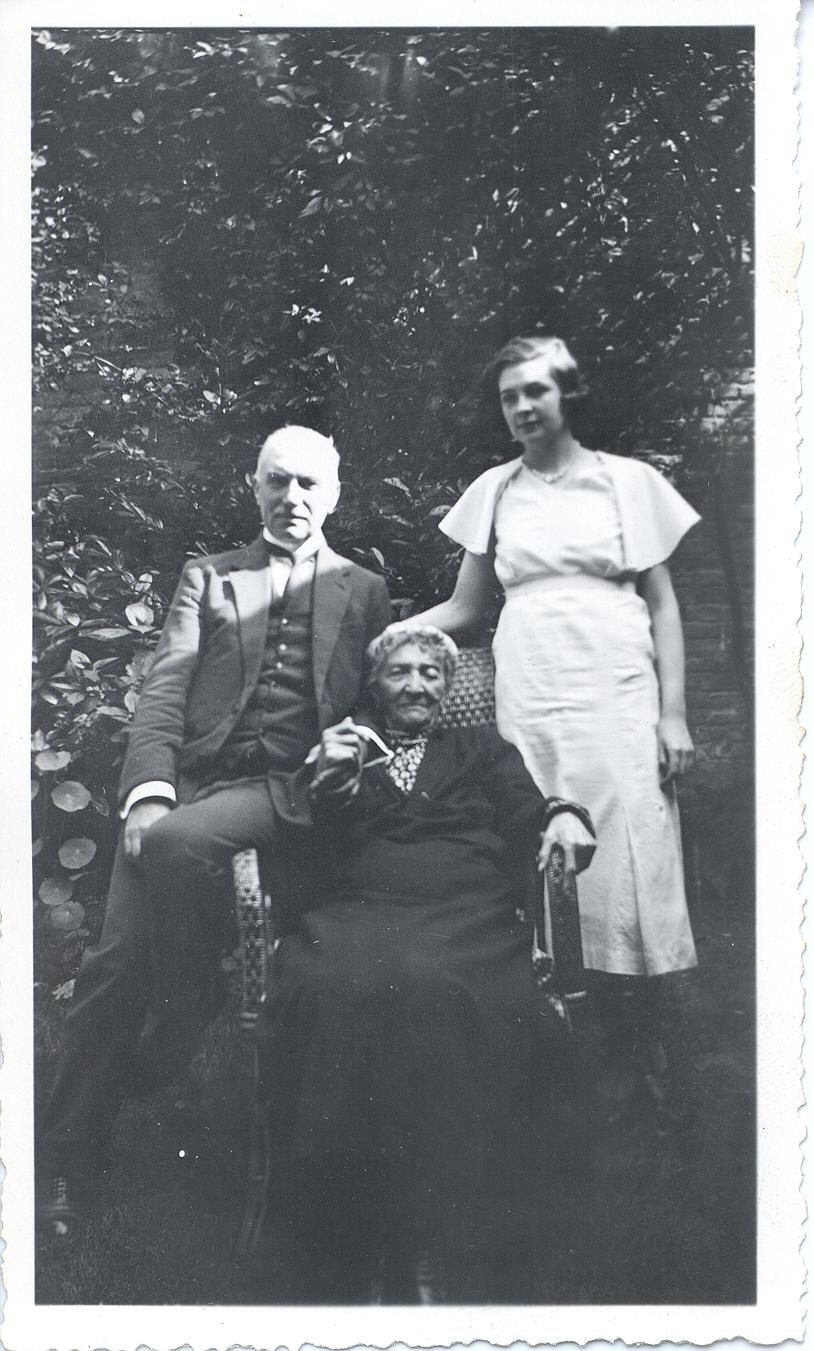
Gabriel Van Dievoet in company of his aunt (general Rouen's wife) and his niece Andrée de Gachassin-Lafite, c.1921

Gabriel Van Dievoet (/ˈdiːvʊt/, 12 April 1875 – 17 November 1934) was a Belgian decorator and Liberty style sgraffitist. He was the brother of the architect Henri Van Dievoet.

He was the son of Leon Van Dievoet, ship-owner and maritime-agent, and of Hermine Straatman; and the grandson of Eugene van Dievoet and Hortense Poelaert (sister of the famous architect Joseph Poelaert).

== Studies and early career ==
After studying at the Académie Royale des Beaux-Arts in Brussels at the same time as Paul Cauchie, he opened his decorative arts workshop and started collaborating with many Art Nouveau or Late Eclectic architects, such as Victor Boelens, De Kock, Georges Delcoigne, Edouard Elle, Guillaume Low, Georges Peereboom, Edouard Pelseneer, Albert Roosenboom, Fernand Symons, Joseph Van Neck, Armand Van Waesberghe and his own brother, Henri Van Dievoet.

He settled initially at Rue Faider, then at 91 Rue Souveraine in Ixelles, Brussels.

His style is characterized mainly by the use of stylized floral elements.

== Works ==
He designed many sgraffito decorations in Brussels and in Wallonia. He was often inspired by the artworks created during the Arts and Crafts Movement, such as the decorations of the "Maison dorée" (Gold House) in the town of Charleroi.

He also designed the sgraffito decorations of the following monuments:

- the primary school in Drogenbos (1902)
- the Dilbeek town hall (1903)
- the Saint-Alexis college in Geel (1900)
- the church in Erps-Kwerps (1898)
- the church in Machelen (1908)
- the villa "Les Sorbiers" in the "Parc de Genval" at La Hulpe, featuring decorative designs in the shape of service trees, for the architect and owner Fernand Symons (1904)
- the Escoyez castle by the architect Sonneville of Tournai (1904)

He also produced several paintings and watercolours; the prints room ("cabinet des estampes") at the Royal Library of Belgium still preserves his etching entitled "Head of Lion" (reference: F 41265).

== Bibliography ==
- Maurice Culot, Anne-Marie Pirlot, Art Nouveau, Bruxelles, AAM, 2005, pp. 16, 35, 90, 91.
- Simone De Boeck, "GABRIEL VAN DIEVOET" dans, 50 Artistes autour de Victor Horta, Bruxelles, 1996, Académie Royale des Beaux-Arts, tome II.
- Simone De Boeck, "GABRIEL VAN DIEVOET", dans, Sgraffito, n°9, Bruxelles, 1997, p. 13 à 16.
- Simone De Boeck, "Fernand Symons, un architecte trop peu connu", 2^{e} partie, dans, Sgraffito, Bruxelles, n°37, 2004, p. 22.
- Fanny Bouvry, "Famille van Dievoet. Artistes, de père en fils", dans, Le Vif-L'Express, n° 2903, 21-27 novembre 2008, p. 121.
- Façades Art nouveau. Les plus beaux sgraffites de Bruxelles. Façades Art nouveau. Les plus beaux sgraffites de Bruxelles, Patricia D'Oreye, photos Lantent Brandajs, préface Maurice Culot, Bruxelles, 2005.
- Alice Delvaille et Philippe Chavanne, L'Art Nouveau dans le Namurois et en Brabant Wallon, Alleur, 2006.
- Éric Hennaut, Walter Schudel, Jos Vandenbreeden, Linda Van Santvoort, Liliane Liesens, Marie Demanet, Les Sgraffites à Bruxelles, Fondation Roi Baudouin, Bruxelles, 1994, pp. 9, 57, 63, 64, 65, 66, 67, 69, arrière de couverture.
- Éric Hennaut, Liliane Liesens, L'avant-garde belge. Architecture 1880-1900, Bruges, 1995, Stichting Sint-Jan et Archives d'Architecture Moderne, pp. 36, 37,
- Éric Hennaut, Maurice Culot, La façade Art Nouveau à Bruxelles, Bruxelles, 2005, AAM, pp. 42, 45, 47.
- Caroline Mierop, L'avenue Louise, collection Bruxelles, ville d'art et d'histoire, Bruxelles, 1997, pp. 20 et 21.
- Benoît Schoonbroodt, Artistes belges de l'Art nouveau (1890-1914), publié aux éditions Racine, Bruxelles, 2008, pp. 38–39, 80–85.
- dir. Anne Van Loo, Dictionnaire de l'Architecture en Belgique de 1830 à nos jours, Anvers, Fonds Mercator, 2003, pp. 40, 562, ill. p. 561.
- Catalogue des Collections, Bruxelles, Archives d'Architecture Moderne, 1999, tome II, p. 282 à 289, et illustrations pp. 29 à 33.
- Les mots de la Maison, volume II, L'intérieur, Archives d'Architecture Moderne, Bruxelles, 1995, pp. 56, 57, 60, 61 (projets aquarellés de Gabriel van Dievoet).
- Revue Sgraffito, n° 50, avril-mai-juin 2007, "Un patrimoine en péril", "avenue de Visé", p. 19. (Concerne la "Villa Ricordo").

== Gallery ==
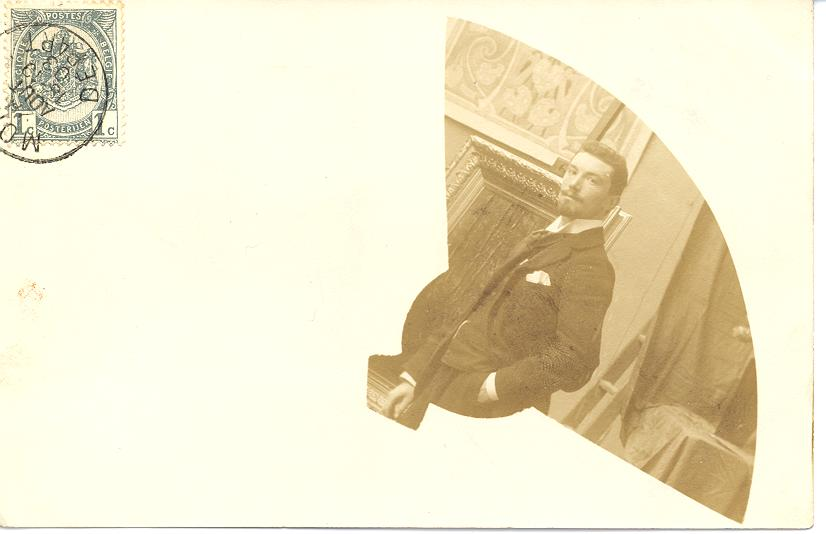
Gabriel van Dievoet in his atelier, 1903.

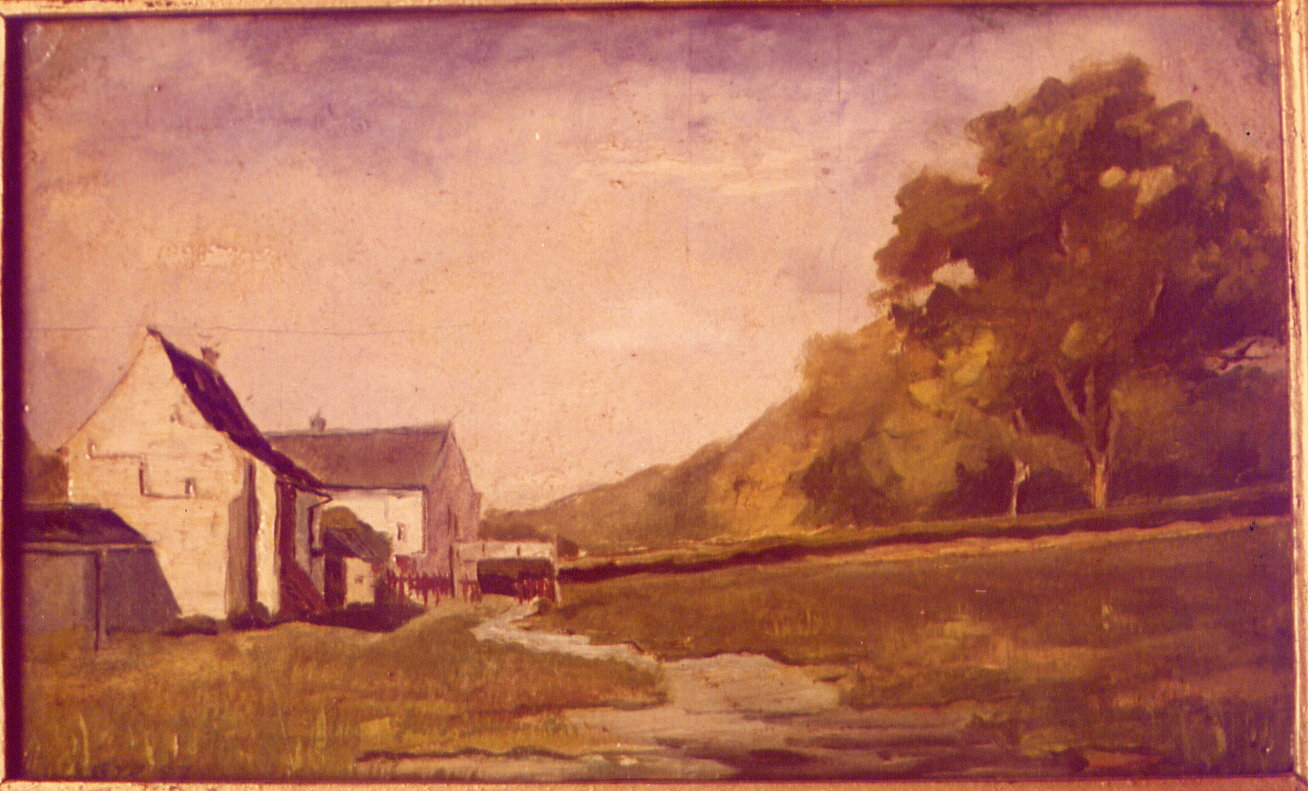
Rouge-Cloître near Brussels, oil 22,5 cm-13,7 cm.

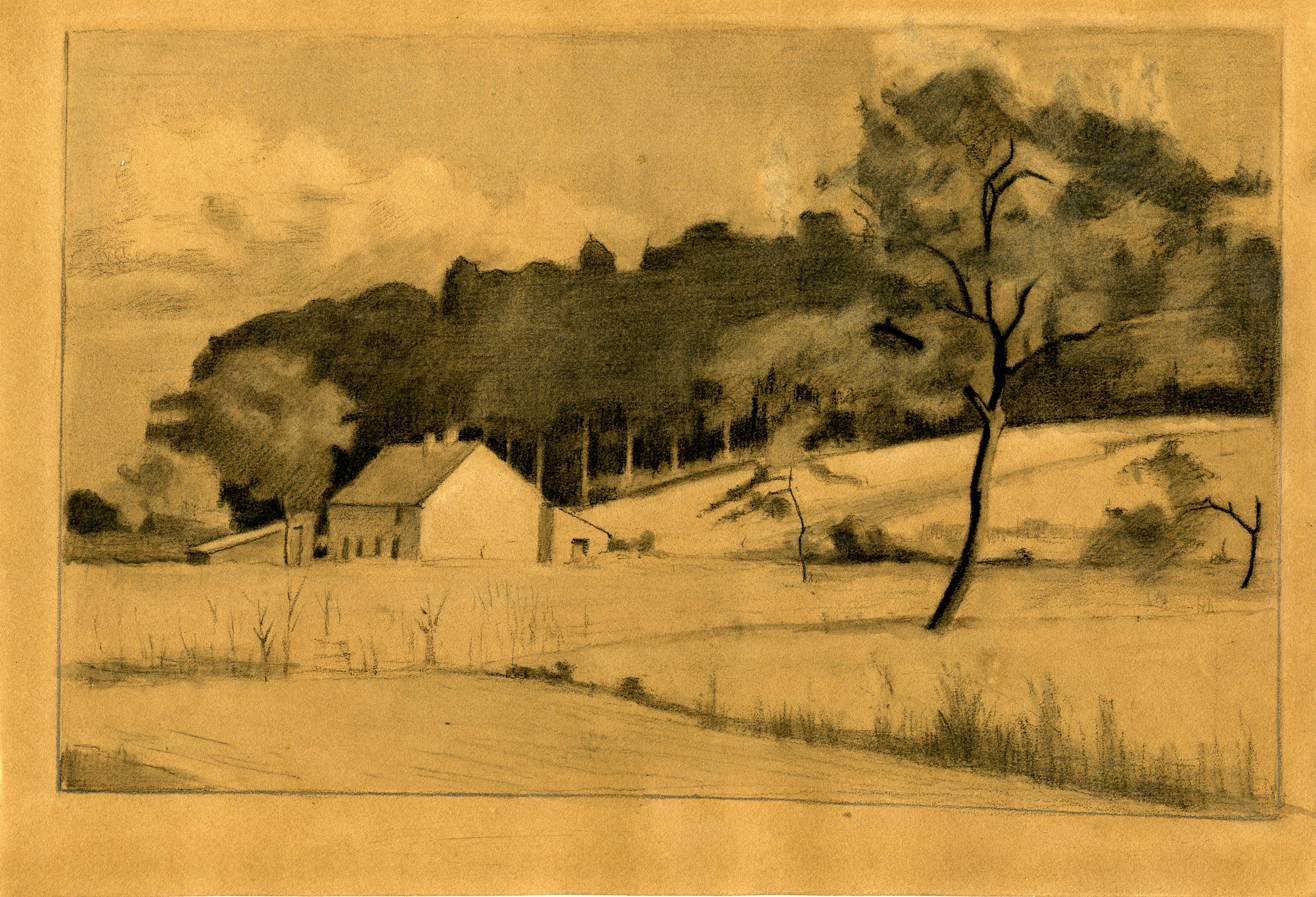
1896 pond.

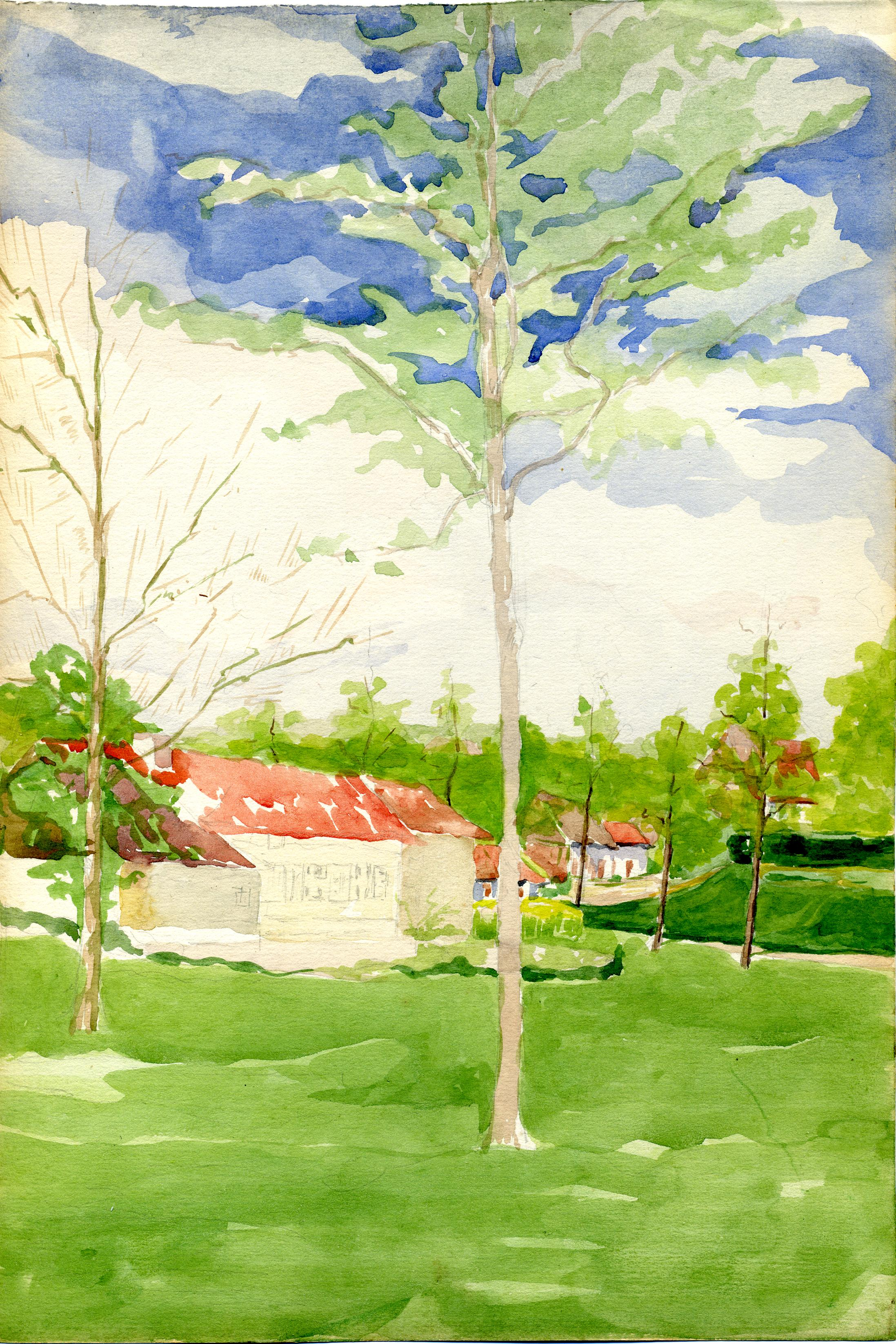
1895, village, watercolour.

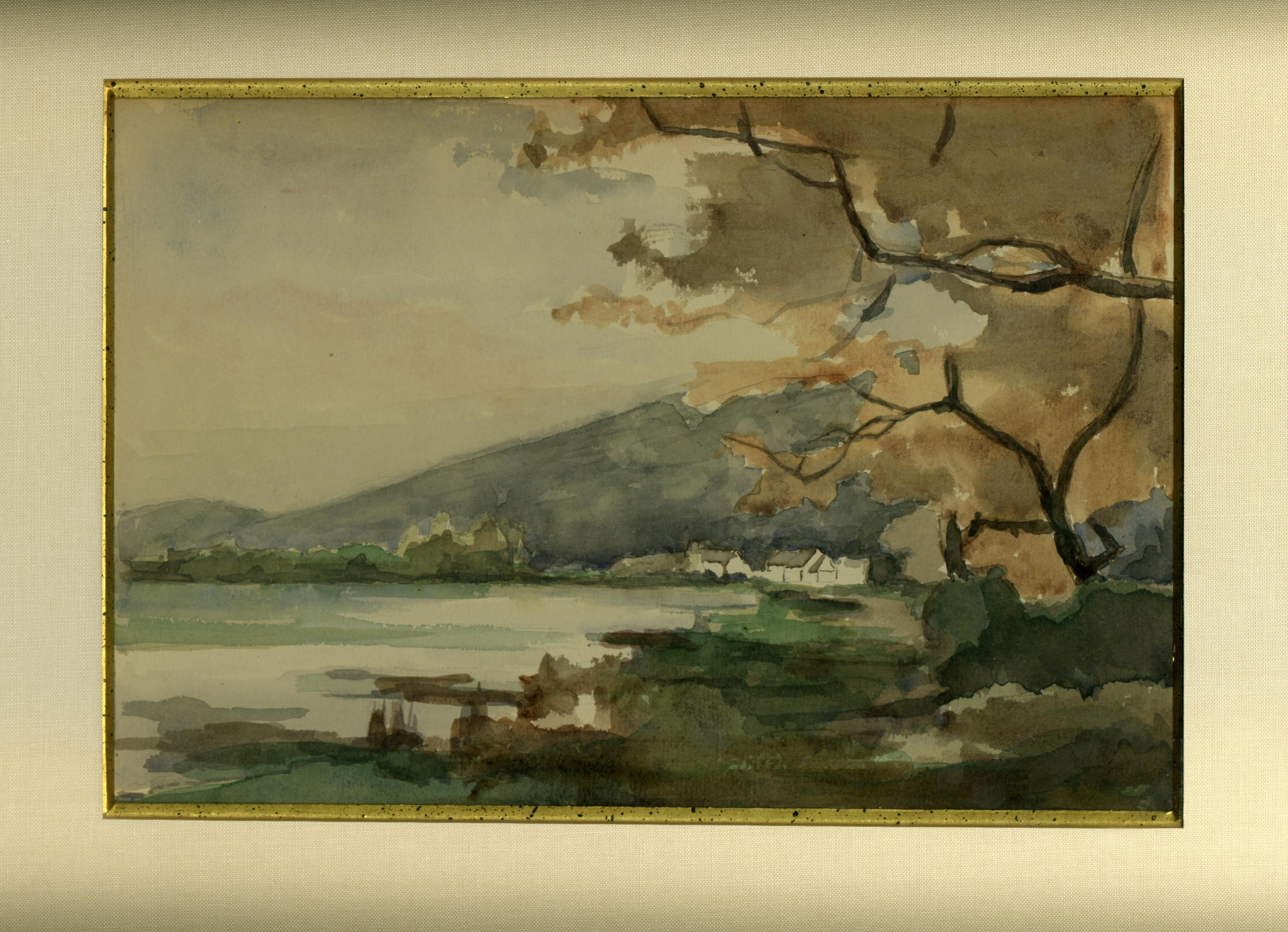
Watercolour, Rouge Cloître.

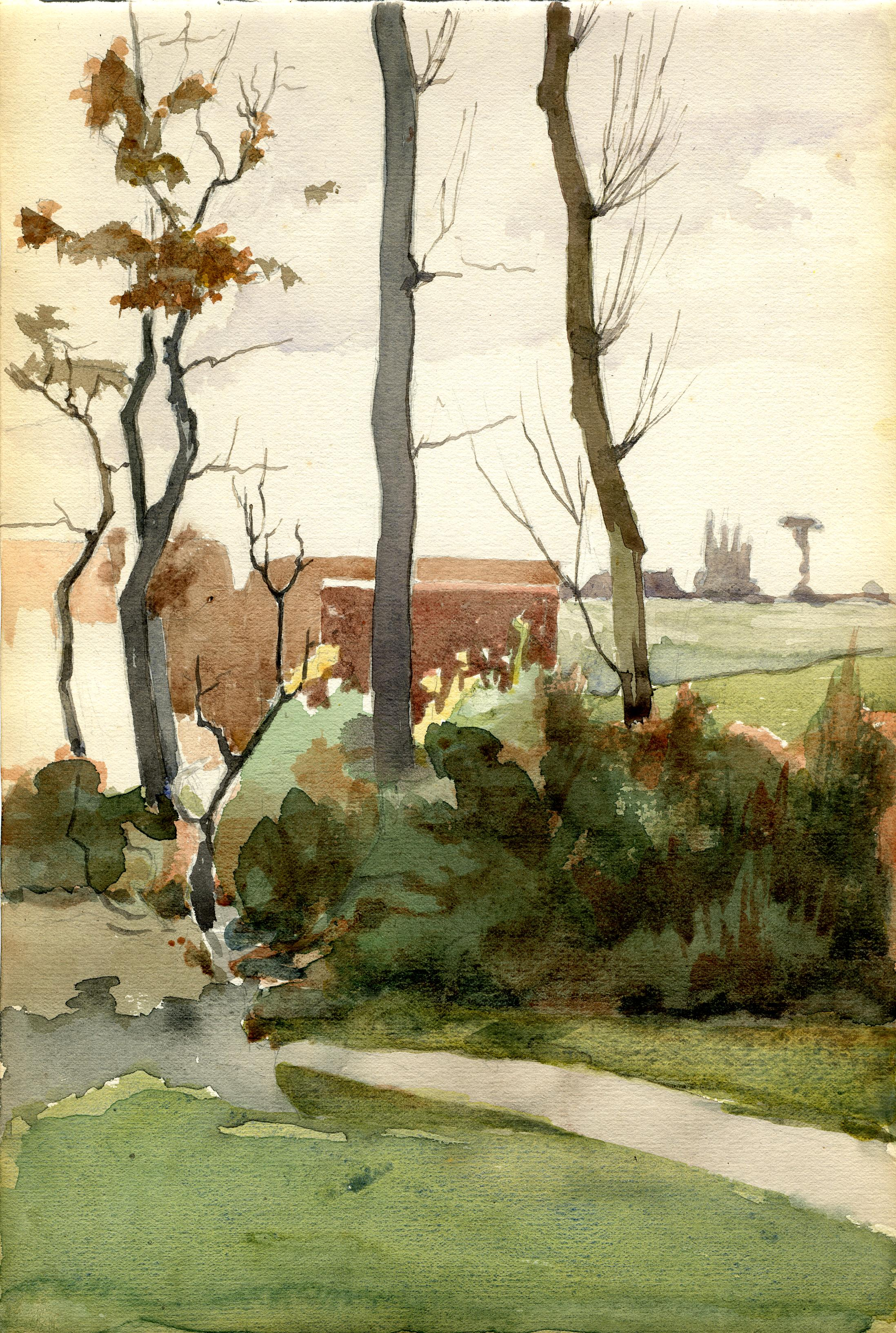
1896, little road in a village.

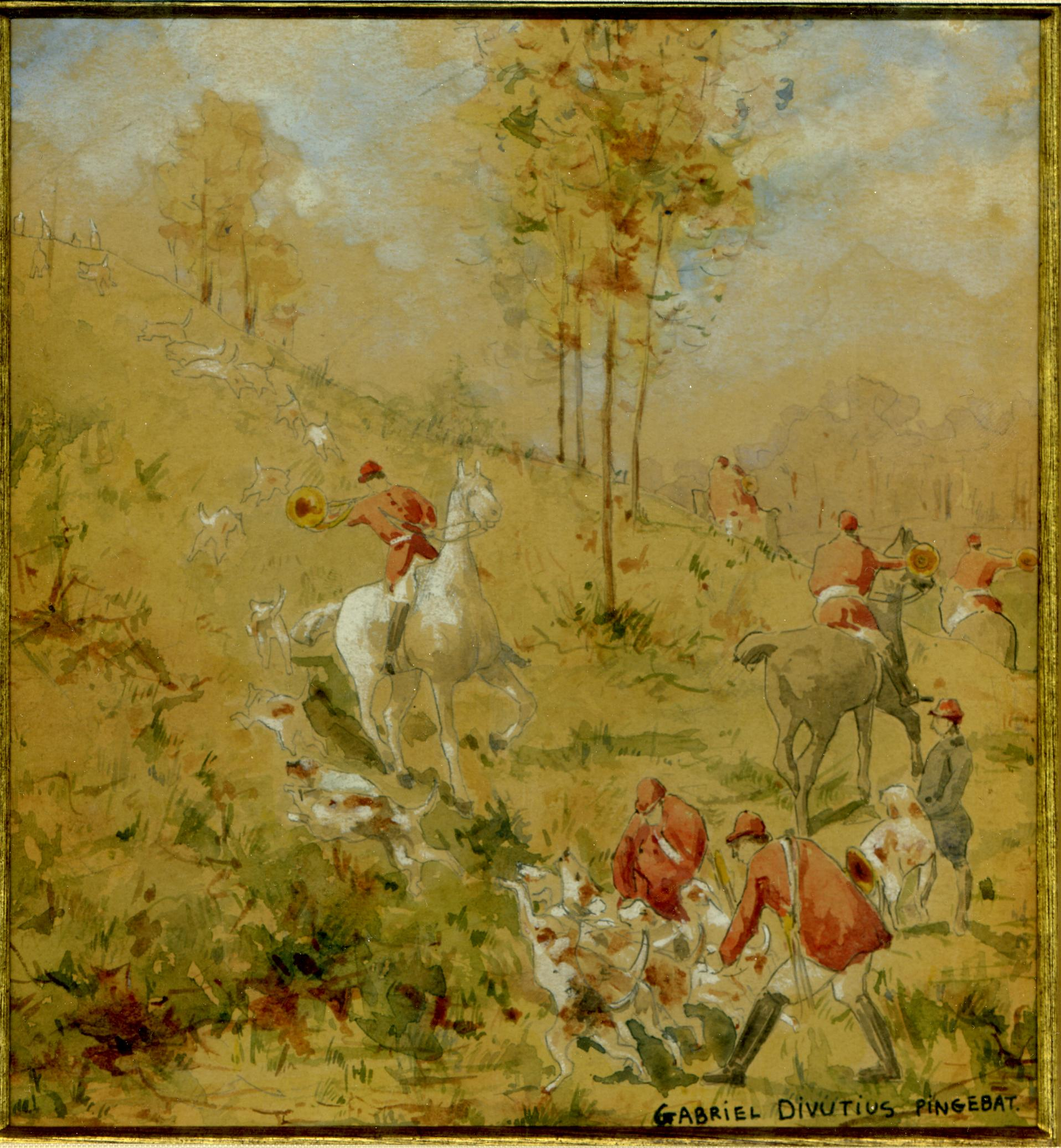
Hunting scene, project of fresco.

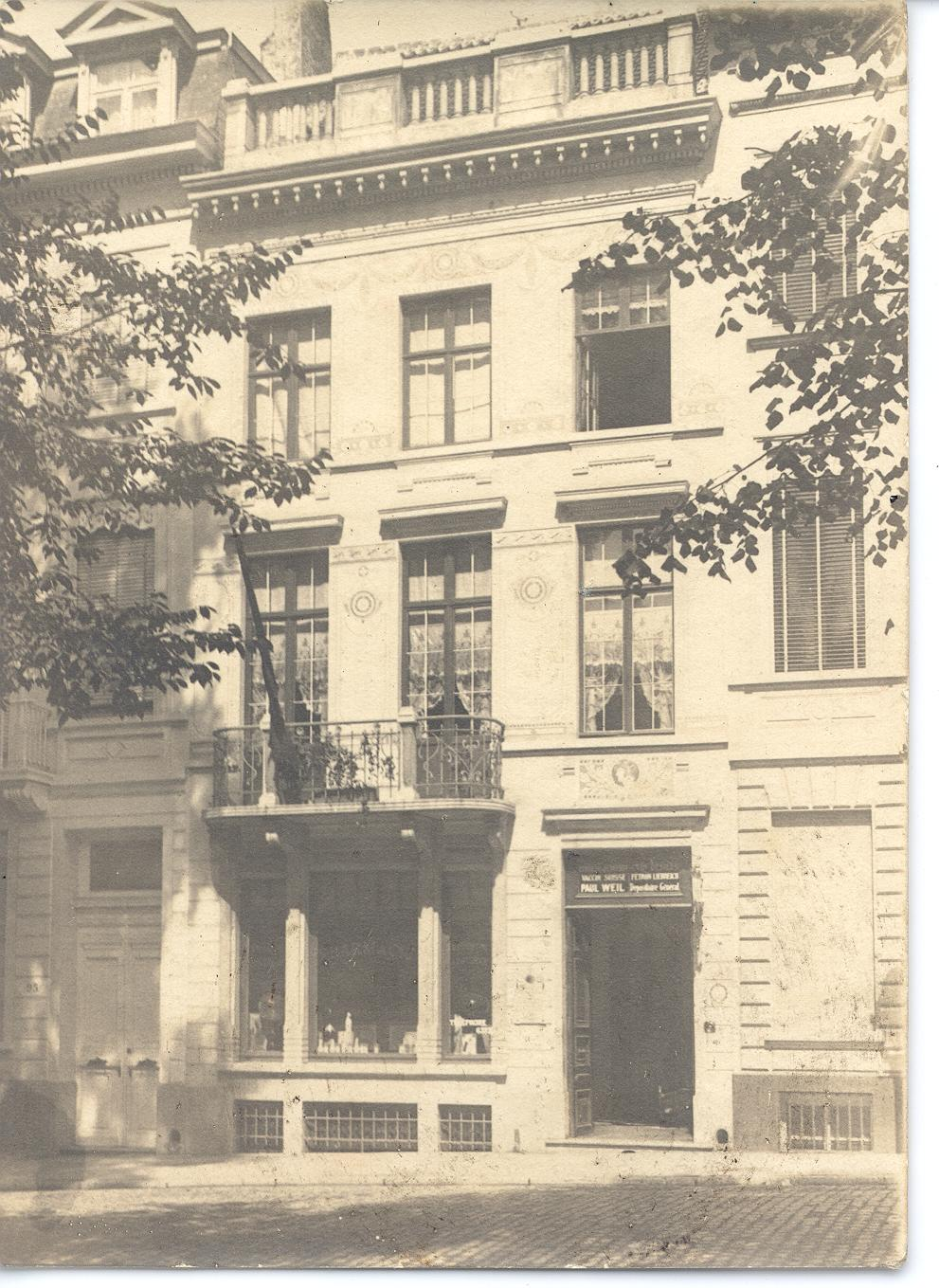
Façade of pharmacy Weil, Brussels, sgraffiti.

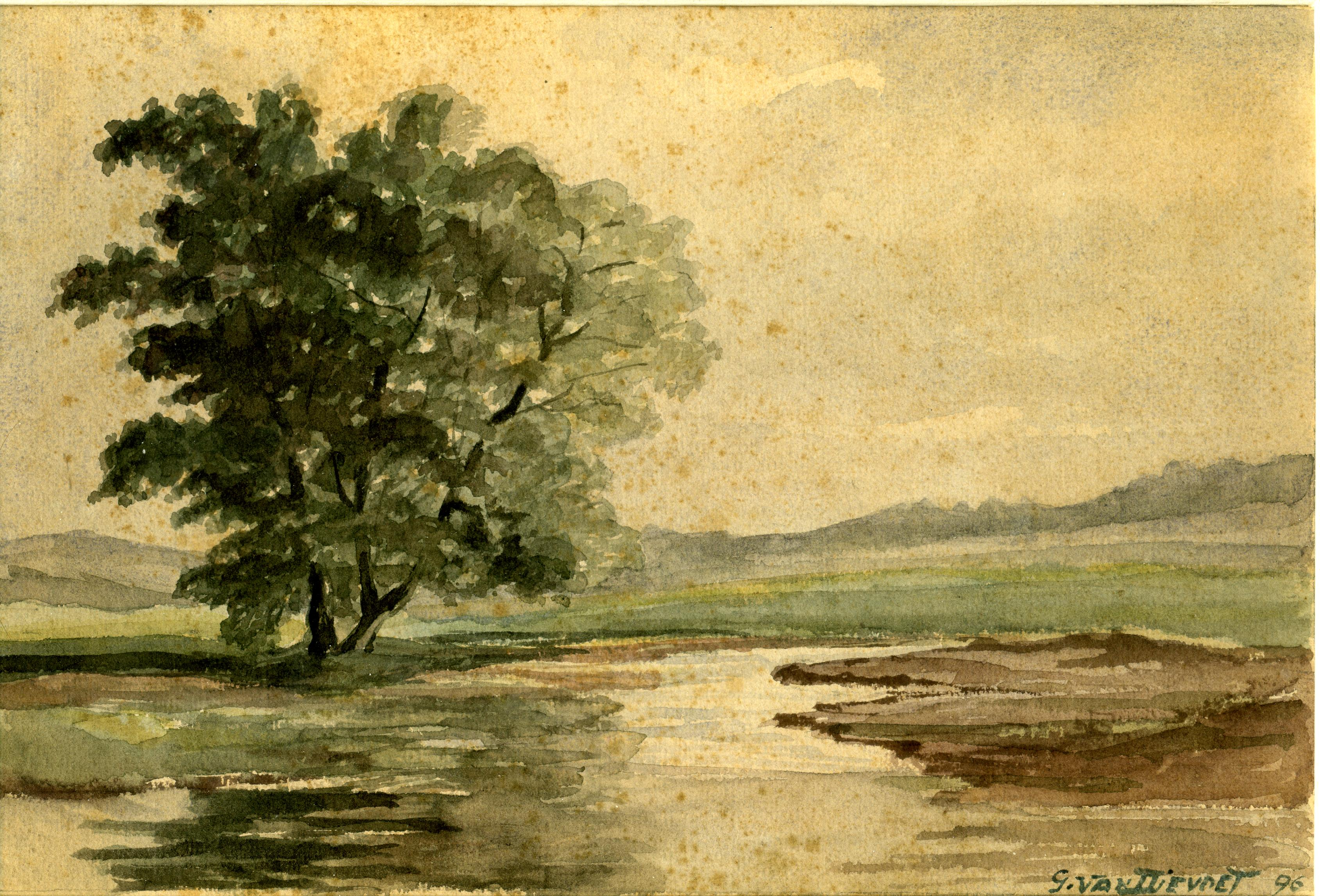
1896, pond, watercolour.

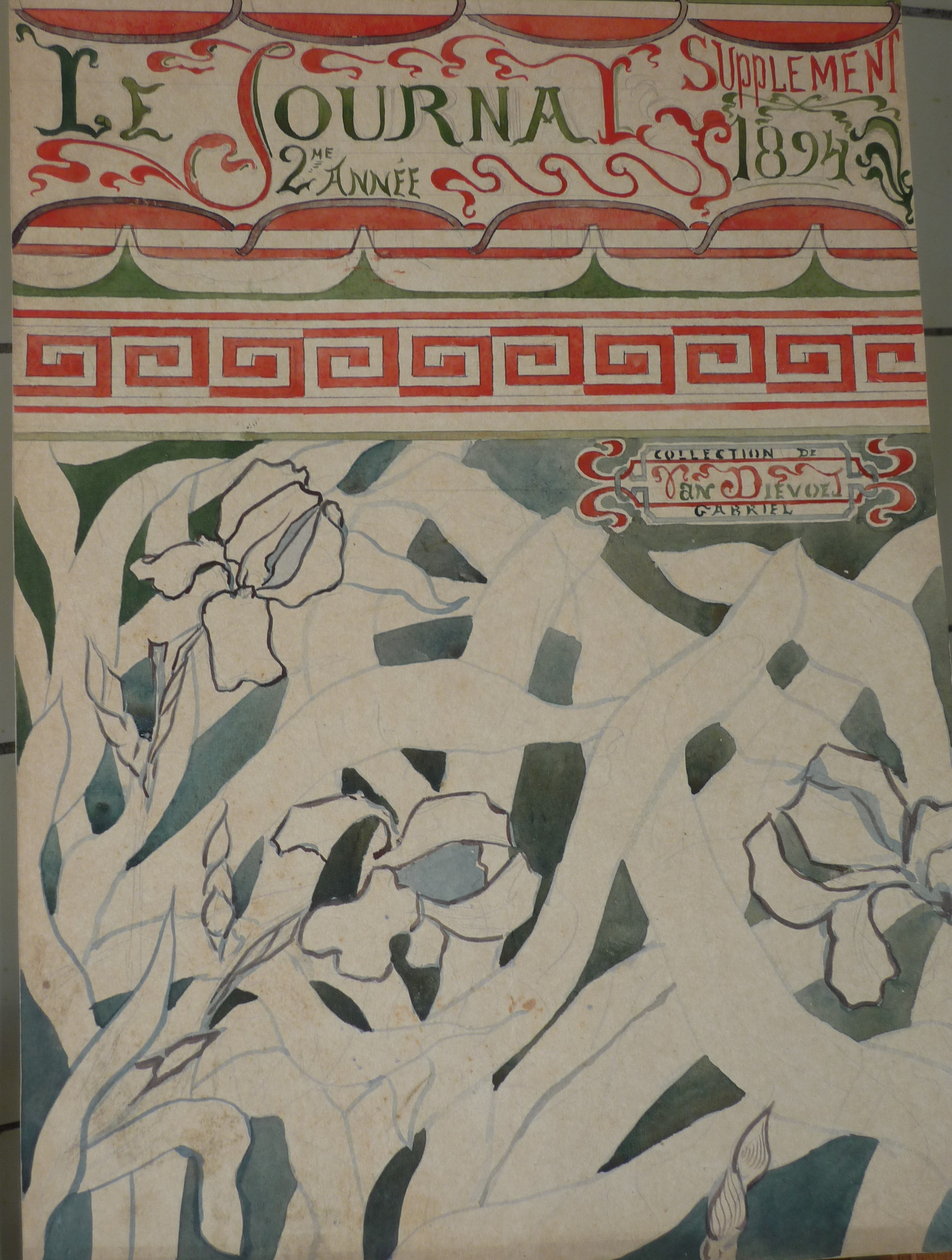
Project of a page for "Le Journal, 1894.

== See also ==
- Van Dievoet family
