= Commemorative Medal of the Reign of King Leopold II =

Belgian commemorative medal

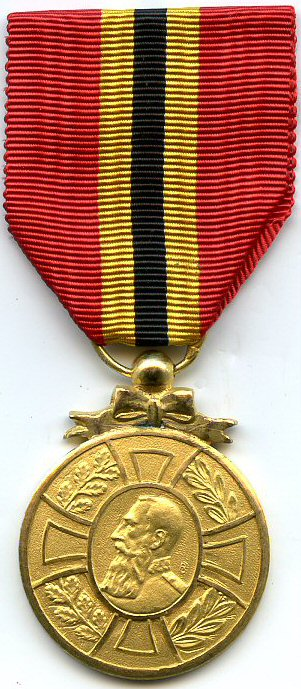
- Commemorative Medal of the Reign of King Leopold II (obverse)
- Type: Commemorative medal
- Awarded for: 20 years of service between 1865 and 1909
- Presented by: Kingdom of Belgium
- Eligibility: Belgian citizens
- Status: No longer awarded
- Established: 21 July 1905

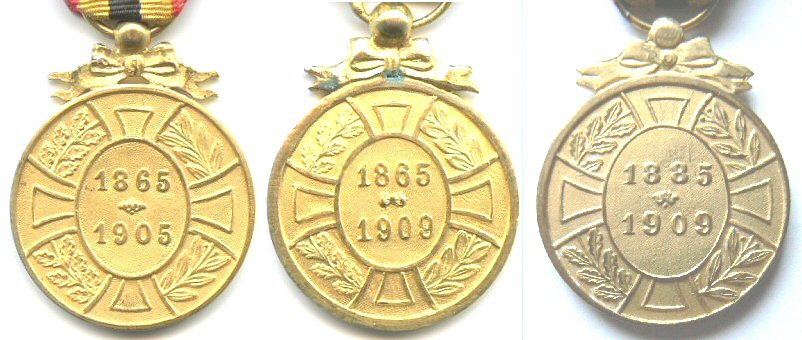
Reverse of the three variants

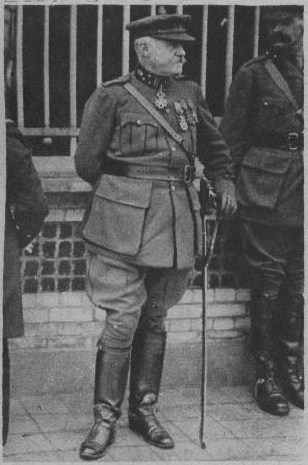
Lieutenant General Félix Wielemans, a recipient of the Commemorative Medal of the Reign of King Leopold II

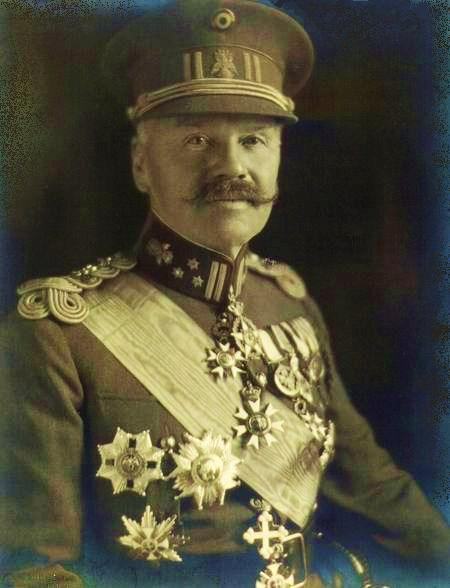
Lieutenant General Baron Jules Jacques de Dixmude, a recipient of the Commemorative Medal of the Reign of King Leopold II

The Commemorative Medal of the Reign of King Leopold II (French: Médaille Commémorative du Règne du Roi Léopold II, Dutch: Herinneringsmedaille aan de Regeerperiode van Leopold II) was a Belgian civilian and later military and police forces medal originally established on 21 July 1905 by royal decree to commemorate the 40th year of the reign of King Leopold II.

The medal was initially awarded to civil servants with a minimum of 20 years of honourable service between 1865 and 1905 who were eligible for the Civic Decoration for long service. It was reissued slightly modified (see description below) in 1951 at the request of veterans' groups, to veterans and military personnel who had a minimum of one year's good and faithful service between 16 December 1865 and 18 December 1909. The medal was once again reissued for a third time in 1952, again slightly modified, to members and veterans of the Force Publique who also had a minimum of one year's good and faithful service between 1 July 1885 and 18 December 1909. The one year's minimum service requirement was later removed by royal decrees in 1959 and 1960.

== Award description ==
The Commemorative Medal of the Reign of King Leopold II was a 33 mm in diameter gilt bronze circular medal. Its obverse bore the relief image of a cross pattée with a central medallion bearing the left profile of King Leopold II; the cross was superimposed over a wreath of laurel and oak branches along the medal's circumference. The reverse bore the same basic design except for the king's profile which was replaced by the years inscribed in relief on two rows "1865 1905" for the initial type (1905) awarded to civil servants, "1865 1909" for the second type (1951) awarded to the military and "1885 1909" to the Force Publique (1952).

The medal was suspended by a ring through a ribbon and bow-shaped suspension loop from a 37 mm wide silk moiré red ribbon with a 3 mm wide central black stripe bordered on both sides by 5 mm wide yellow stripes.

== Notable recipients (partial list) ==
The individuals listed below were awarded the Commemorative Medal of the Reign of King Leopold II:

- Lieutenant General Alphonse Verstraete
- Lieutenant General Joseph Leroy
- Lieutenant General Harry Jungbluth
- Cavalry Lieutenant General Baron Albert du Roy de Blicquy
- Lieutenant General Sir Antonin de Selliers de Moranville
- Lieutenant General Félix Wielemans
- Lieutenant General Baron Louis de Ryckel
- Lieutenant General Baron Émile Dossin de Saint-Georges
- Lieutenant General Baron Honoré Drubbel
- Lieutenant General Count Gérard-Mathieu Leman
- Lieutenant General Victor Bertrand
- Lieutenant General Joseph Jacquet
- Lieutenant General Baron Jules Jacques de Dixmude
- Lieutenant General Georges Guiette
- Lieutenant General Albert Lantonnois van Rode
- Lieutenant General Baron Armand de Ceuninck
- Lieutenant General Aloïs Biebuyck
- Cavalry Lieutenant General Baron Léon de Witte de Haelen
- Cavalry Lieutenant General Vicount Victor Buffin de Chosal
- Cavalry Lieutenant General Jules De Blauwe
- Cavalry Lieutenant General Count André de Jonghe d’Ardoye
- Cavalry Lieutenant General Fernand du Roy de Blicquy
- Cavalry Lieutenant General Baron Emile de Wykerslooth de Rooyensteyn
- Cavalry Lieutenant General Gustave Fivé
- Lieutenant General Baron Théophile Wahis
- Lieutenant General Louis Cuvelier
- Lieutenant General Charles-Joseph Lambeau
- Lieutenant General Baron Albert Donny
- Lieutenant General François-Guillaume Boÿ Aert
- Lieutenant General Emile Libbrecht
- Cavalry Lieutenant General Count Frédéric van der Stegen de Putte
- Cavalry Major General Count Théodore-Louis d’Oultremont
- Governor Baron Raymond de Kerchove d’Exaerde
- Governor Camille Count de Briey Baron de Landres
- Ambassador Count Charles Maximilien de Lalaing
- Ambassador Baron Albéric Fallon
- Ambassador Count Conrad de Buisseret-Steenbecque de Blarenghien
- Ambassador Baron Ludovic Moncheur
- Count Edmond Carton de Wiart

== See also ==
- Leopold II of Belgium
- Monarchy of Belgium
- Congo Free State
- Force Publique
- Democratic Republic of the Congo
- Orders, decorations, and medals of Belgium

== Other sources ==
- Quinot H., 1950, Recueil illustré des décorations belges et congolaises, 4e Edition. (Hasselt)
- Cornet R., 1982, Recueil des dispositions légales et réglementaires régissant les ordres nationaux belges. 2e Ed. N.pl., (Brussels)
- Borné A.C., 1985, Distinctions honorifiques de la Belgique, 1830-1985 (Brussels)
