= Marcel De Corte =

Marcel De Corte is the name of:

- Marcel De Corte (footballer) (1929–2017), Belgian footballer
- Marcel De Corte (philosopher) (1905–1994), Belgian philosopher
