= Lismonde =

Belgian painter (1908–2001)

Jules Lismonde
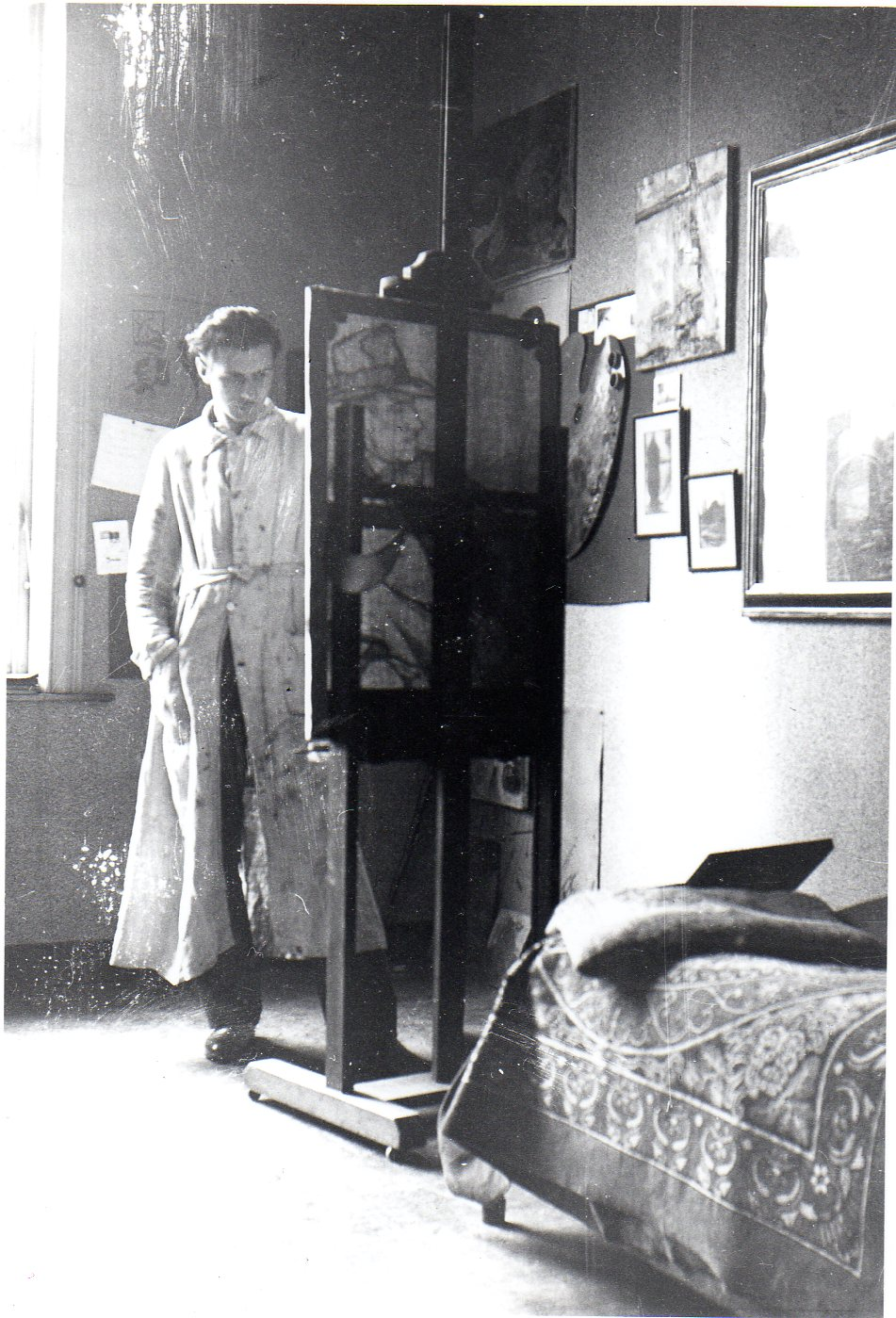
- Born: 14 May 1908; Anderlecht
- Died: 12 March 2001 (aged 92); Linkebeek
- Occupation: Painter
- Organization: Royal Academy of Science, Letters and Fine Arts of Belgium

Jules Lismonde (known professional as simply Lismonde; 14 May 1908 – 12 March 2001) was a Belgian painter and drawer. He was a member of the Royal Academy of Science, Letters and Fine Arts of Belgium.

== Biography ==
Lismonde lived in the villa called Les Roches where he spent 50 years of his life with his wife Albertine De Wispelaere (6 August 1908 – 23 October 1997).

=== Beginnings ===
Lismonde started drawing as a child, and was brought up in an artistic family that admired the work of Steinlen, Forain and fashionable English drawers.

While a student at the Royal Athenaeum of Brussels, he collaborated to the Pallas review by publishing his drawings and caricatures there.

Since he played the flute, he hesitated between a musical and artistic career, but he settled on the visual arts.

As a young man, as early as 1925, he started painting the Brabantian countryside with painter Edgar Bytebier [fr] (1875-1940).

=== Career ===
After practicing oil painting, of which there remain a few examples (portraits, landscapes), he became passionate about drawing in a refined expression in black and white. It was also then that he discovered etching.

In 1934, Jean Groffier [fr] wrote : « As a painter, let it be said, Lismonde was not a colorist. Under the painter's brush, a drawer was hiding. His colour is sad, wary, his effects are gray; but of a delicious melancholy. Actually, the "landscaper" that is Lismonde is one of the most interesting characters of the Belgian visual arts world and whose name will soon cross our borders. ».

Though he did not exactly fit into any artistic "school", he participated in 1945 in the creation of the movement « Jeune Peinture belge [fr] » (lit. 'Young Belgian painting') and to the group called « Cap d'Encre ».

Lismonde was also a portrait painter and he completed in the 1930s and 40s a series of portraits, especially in charcoal, of personalities from the intellectual and literary world of his time like the poets Luc Indestege, Maurice Carême, Gaston Heux [fr], the writers Constant Burniaux [fr], Louis Lebeer, the philosopher Marcel De Corte [fr], the architect Léon Van Dievoet or the painters Charles Dehoy or Jacques Veraart [fr].

=== Exhibitions ===
His first personal exhibition took place in 1930 where his paintings were particularly popular.

An exhibition of his works at the Palais des Beaux-Arts in Brussels in 1953 officially consecrated his art.

Then he had personal exhibitions in Venice, Sao Paulo, Tokyo, and the Stedelijk Museum in Amsterdam in 1950. The 9th biennale of Black&White of Lugano dedicated him a room. In 1958, he represented Belgium at the 1958 Venice Biennale where he won the Renato Carrain Prize.

There are tapestries and a sculpture by him in the Pétillon metro station in Brussels.

== Documentary ==
In 1978, Patrick Van Antwerpen produced a documentary on Lismonde.

== The Lismonde Foundation ==
Lismonde donated his house to the municipality of Linkebeek, it now serves as a place for music, meetings and exhibitions.

== Gallery ==
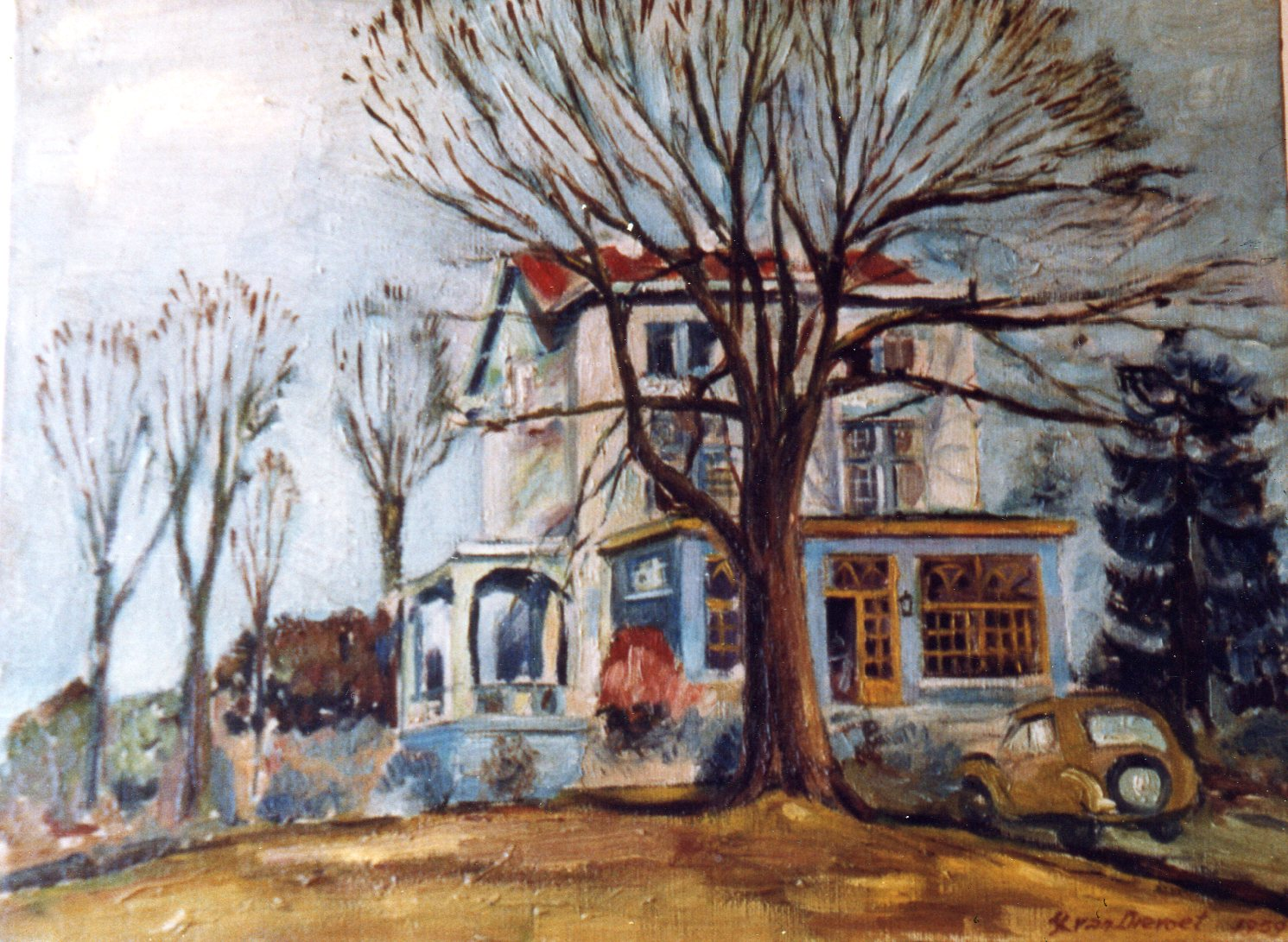
Lismonde's villa in Linkebeek "Les Roches", oil by Léon van Dievoet, 1959.

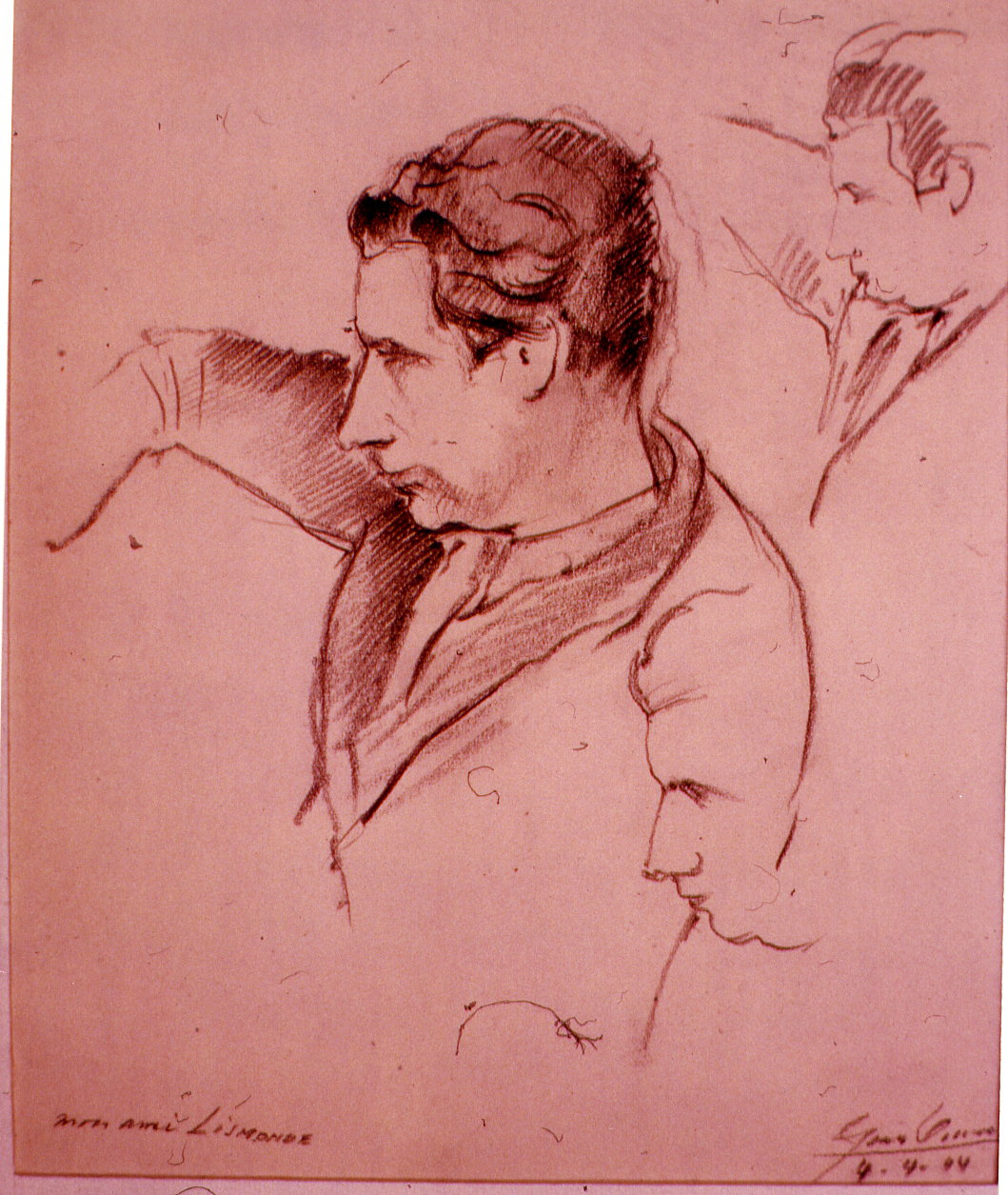
Lismonde, portrait by Léon van Dievoet, 4 April 1944.

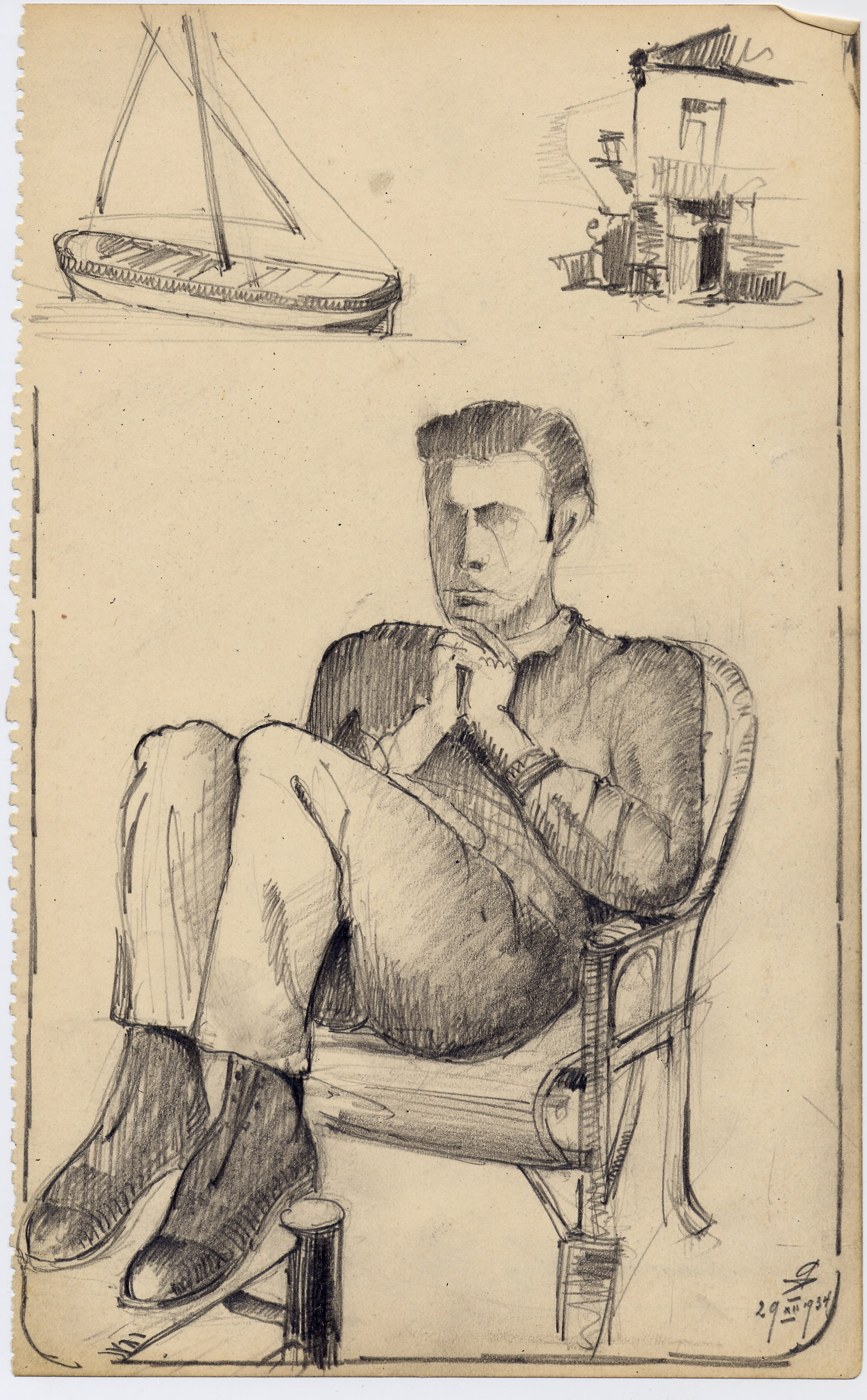
Lismonde at his home, drawing by Léon van Dievoet, 29 December 1934.

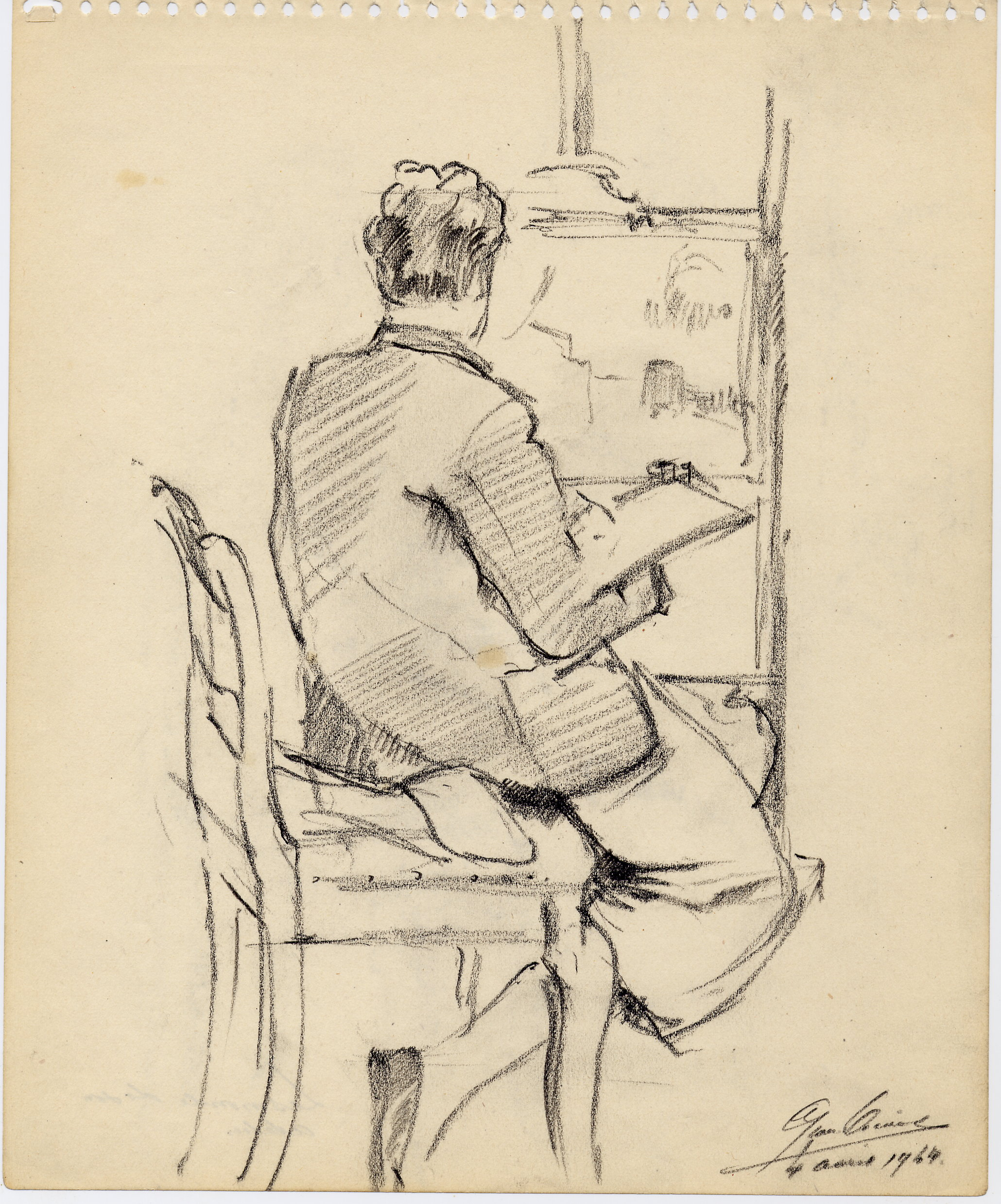
Lismonde in his workshop, drawing by Léon van Dievoet, 4 April 1944.

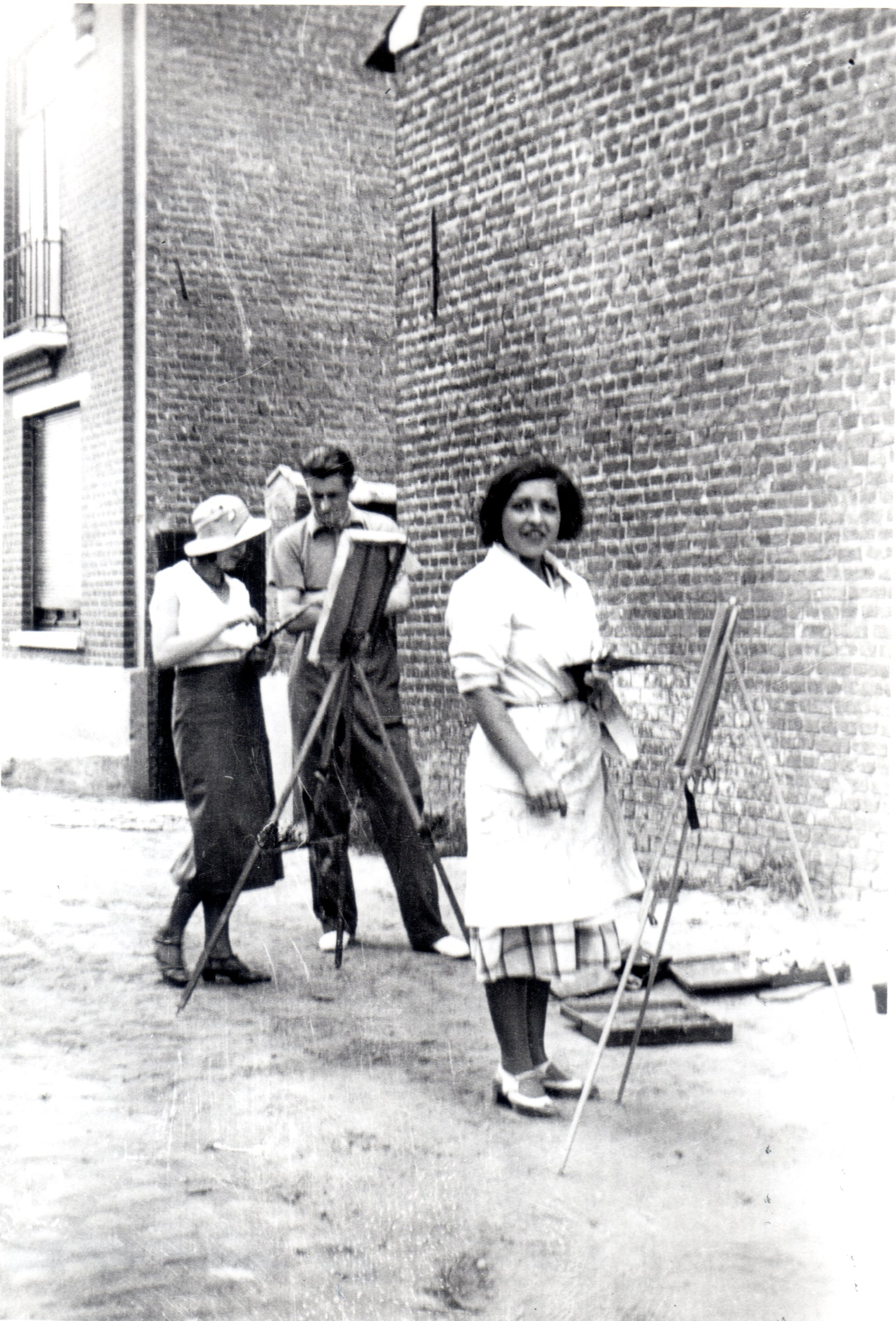
Lismonde painting with the painters Rachel De Bièvre and, in the foreground, Goda Isgour, sister of the architect Isia Isgour, in Dilbeek, August 20, 1932 (photo by Léon van Dievoet)

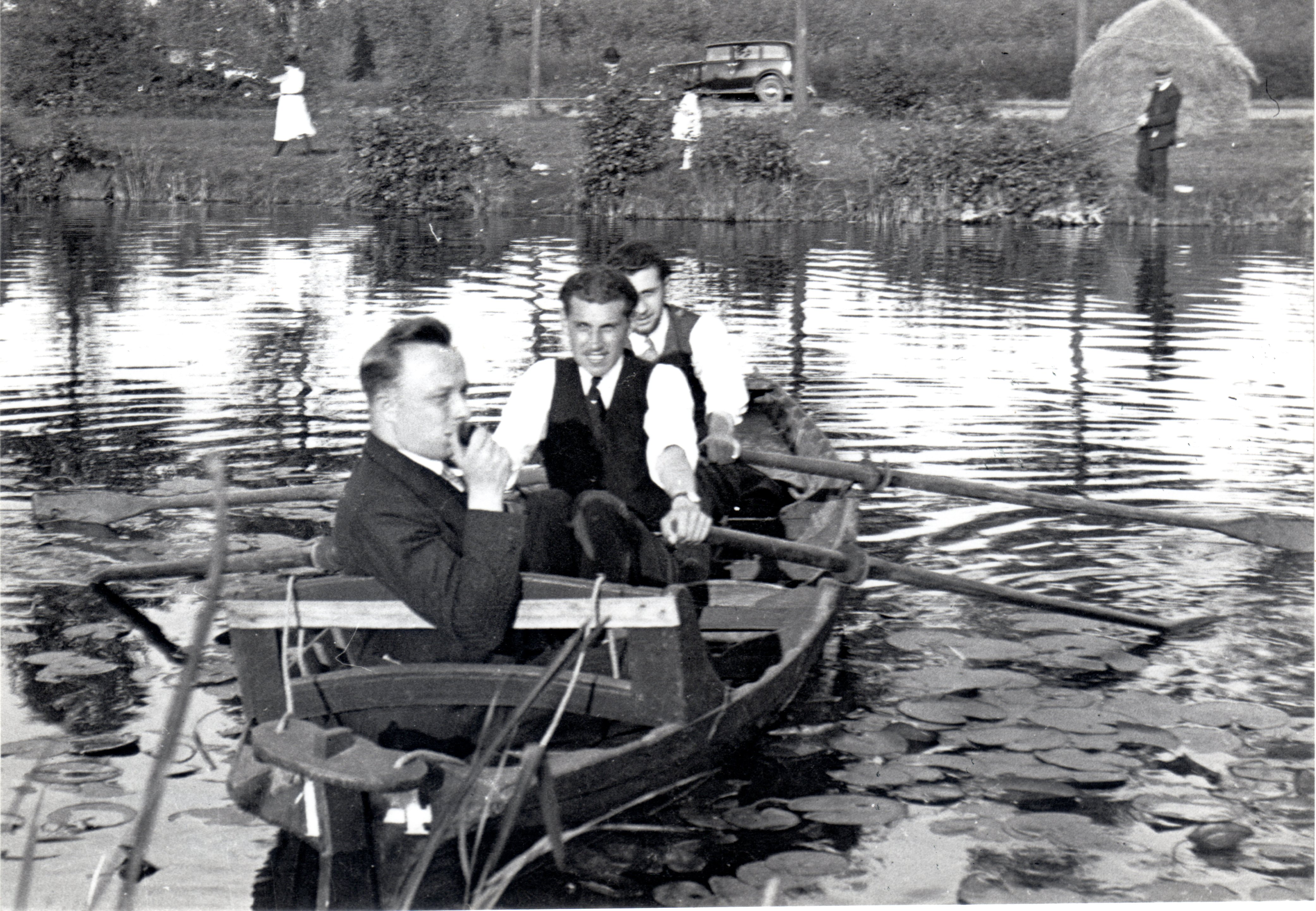
From left to right: Jean Callebaut, the architect Léon van Dievoet and Lismonde, in a canoe on Lake Overmeire on September 3, 1933.

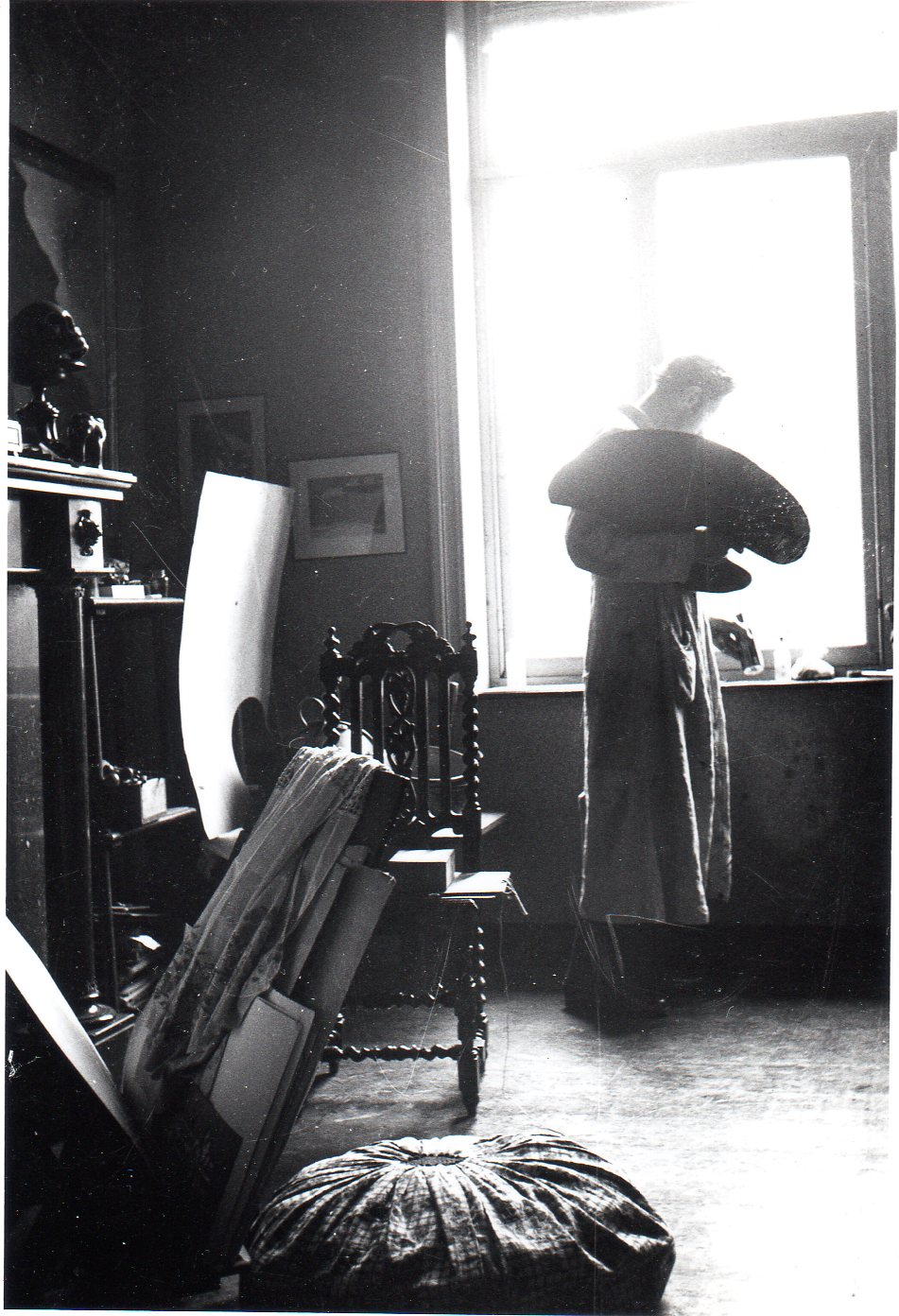
Lismonde in his workshop in Moortebeek, November 27, 1933 (photo by Léon van Dievoet).

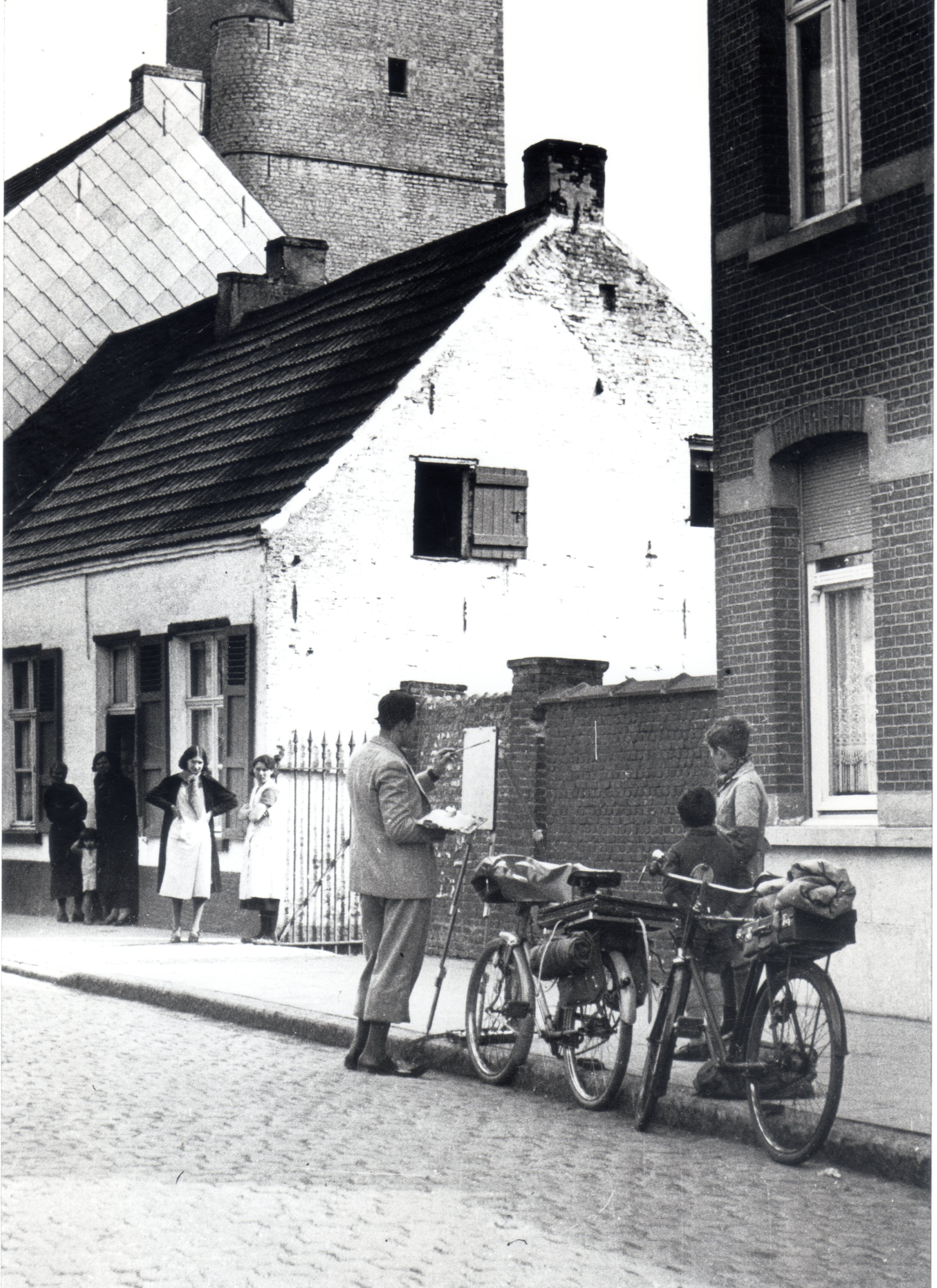
Lismonde painting in the village of Neylen, April 6, 1936 (photo by Léon van Dievoet).

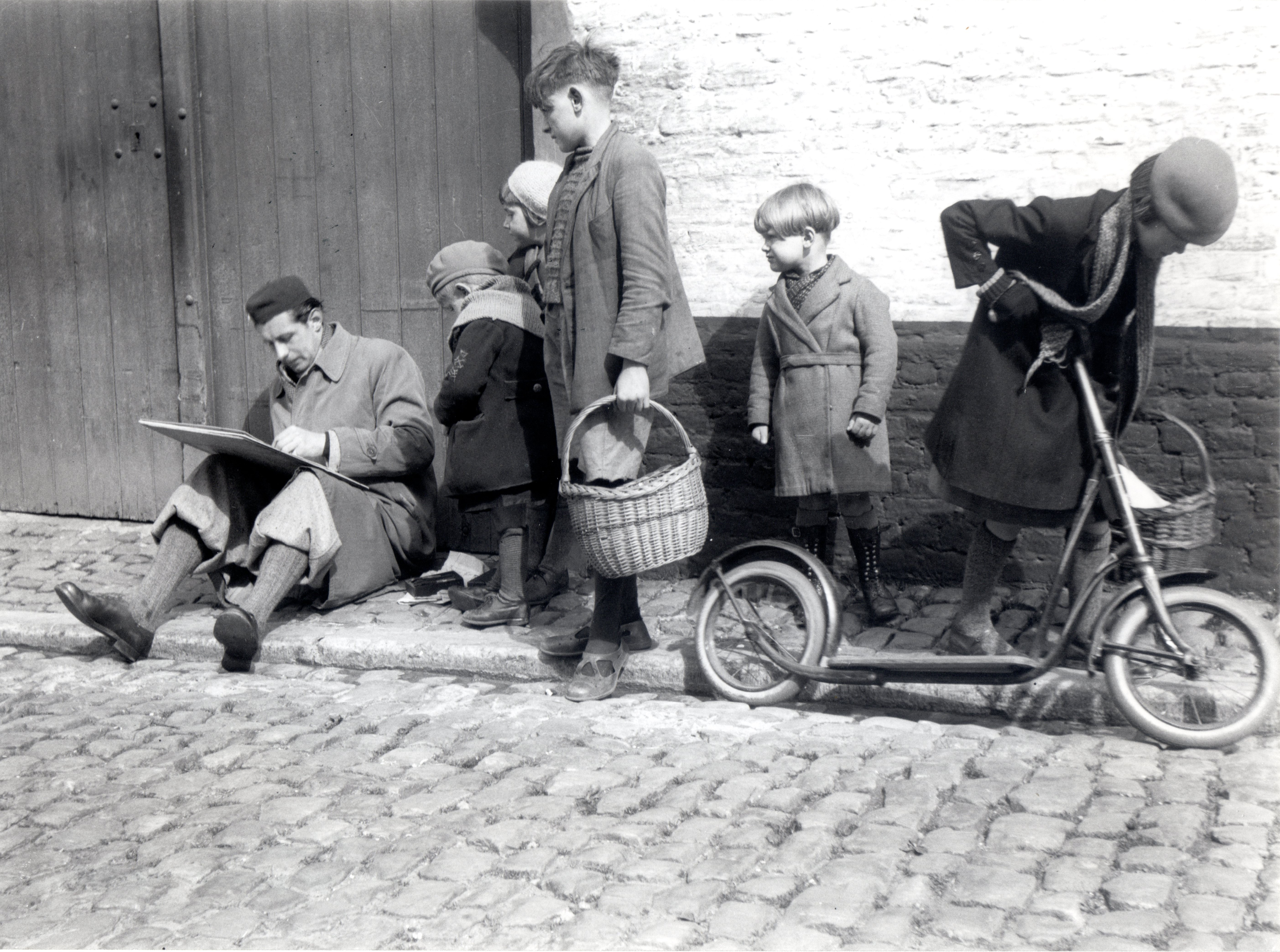
Lismonde drawing the church of Diest on April 7, 1936 (photo by Léon van Dievoet).

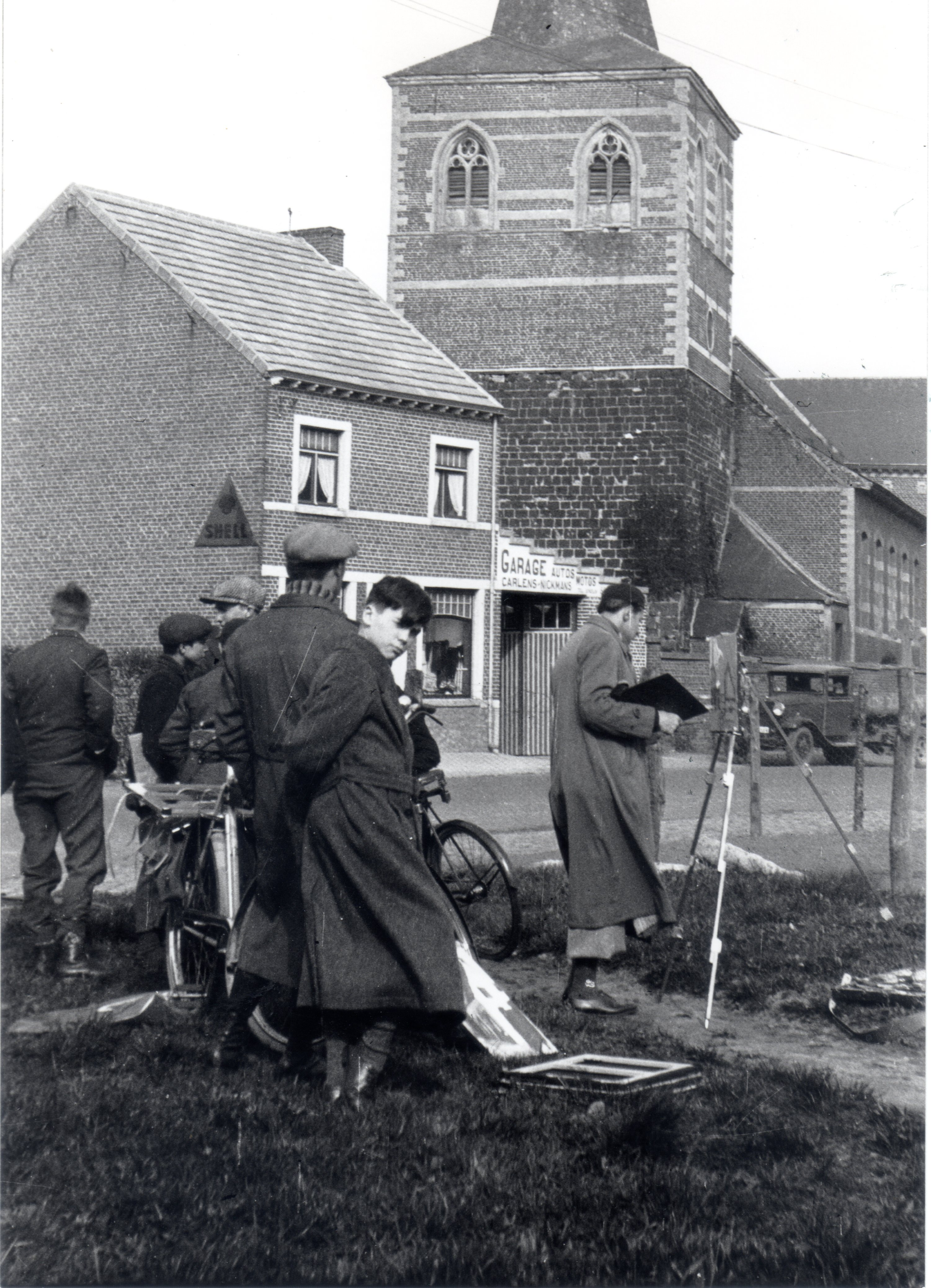
Lismonde painting in the village of Kermt, April 7, 1936 (photo by Léon van Dievoet).

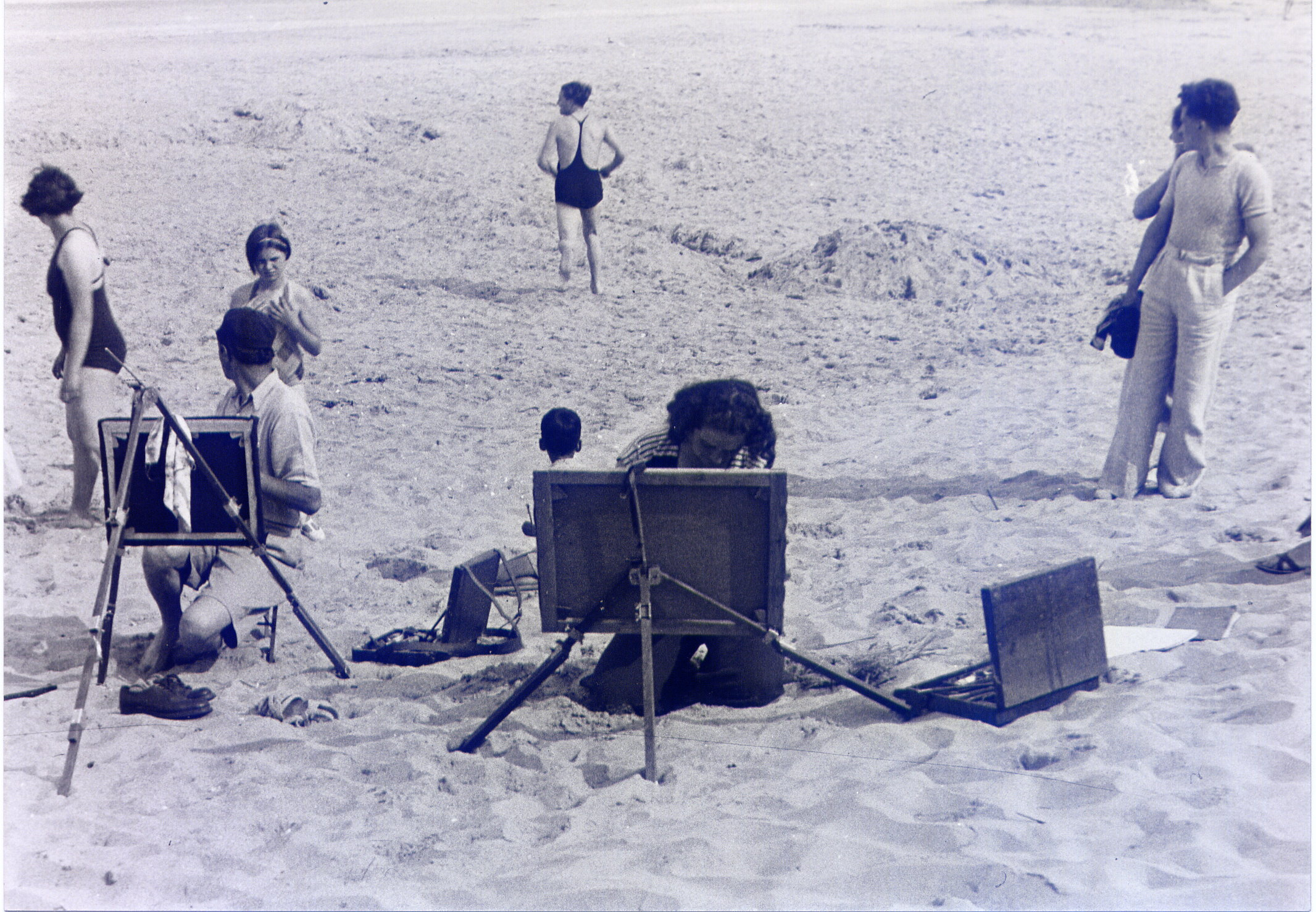
Lismonde painting with the painter Marguerite Antoine on the beach at Nieuport in August 1936 (photo by Léon van Dievoet).

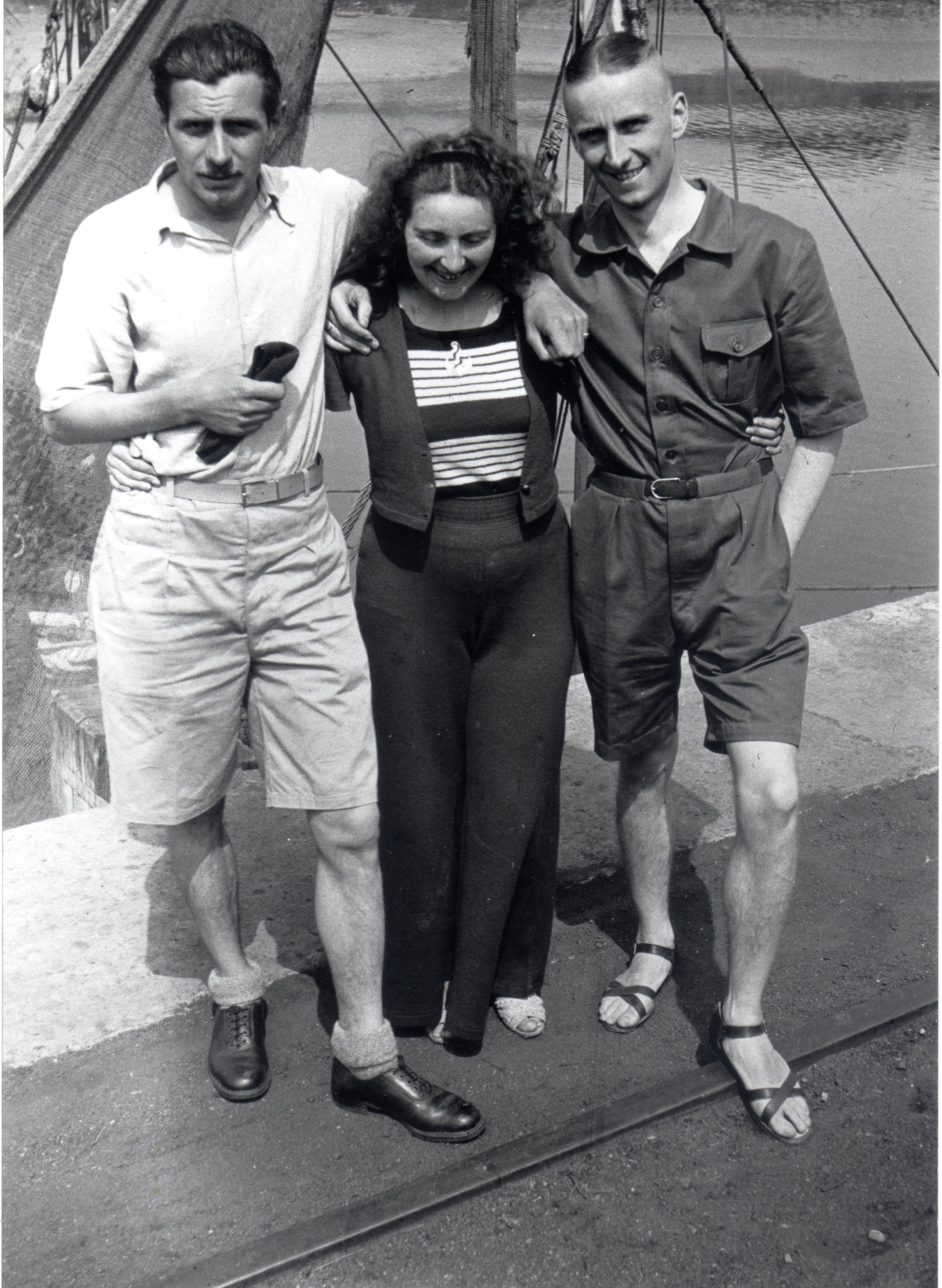
From left to right, Lismonde, the painter Marguerite Antoine and Fernand Cannoot, in Nieuport in August 1936 (photo by Léon van Dievoet).

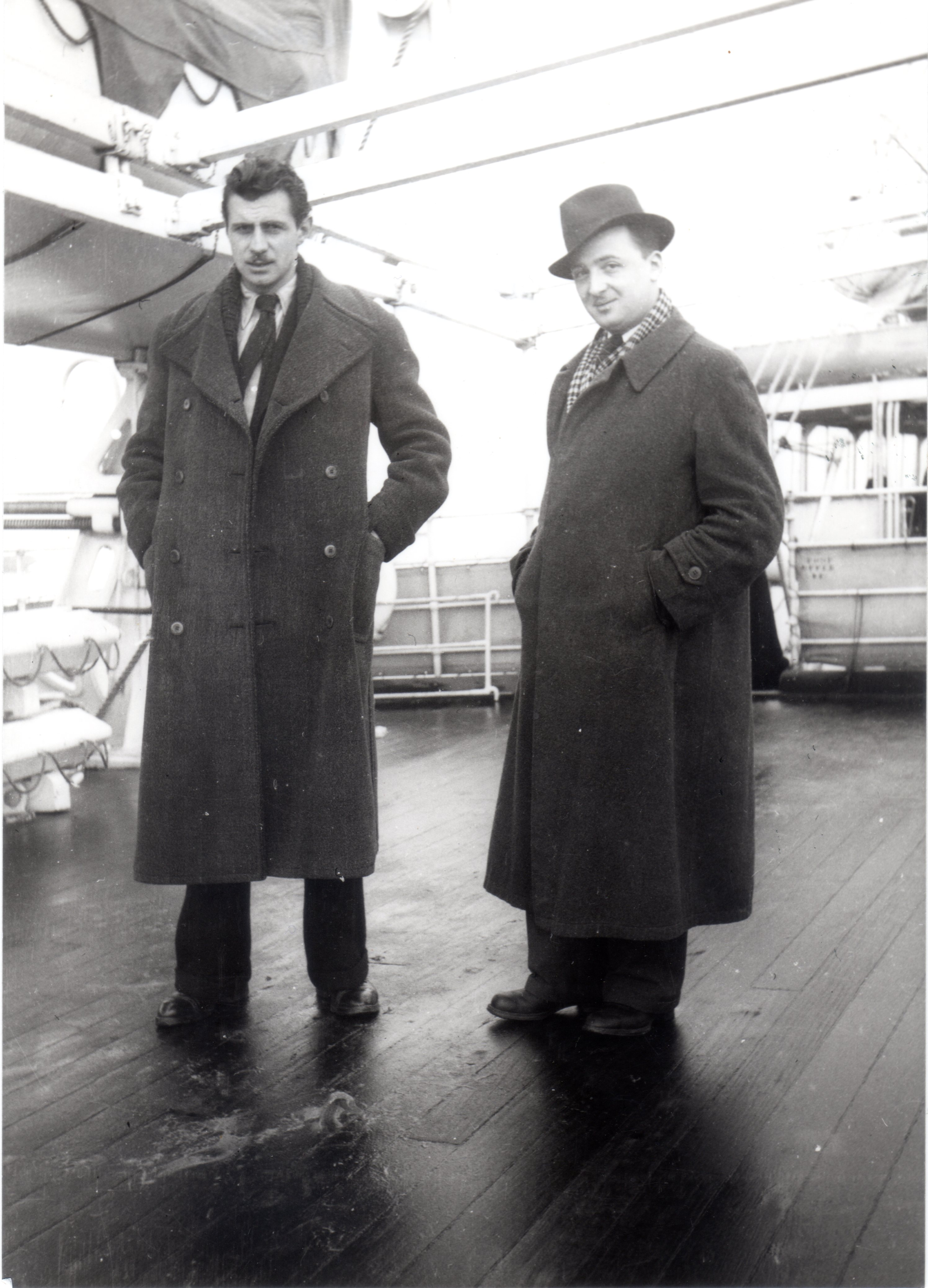
Lismonde with his friend Jacques de Wouters d'Oplinter (1909-1972) on the Alberville before the latter's departure for the Belgian Congo. Antwerp, December 17, 1937 (photo by Léon van Dievoet).

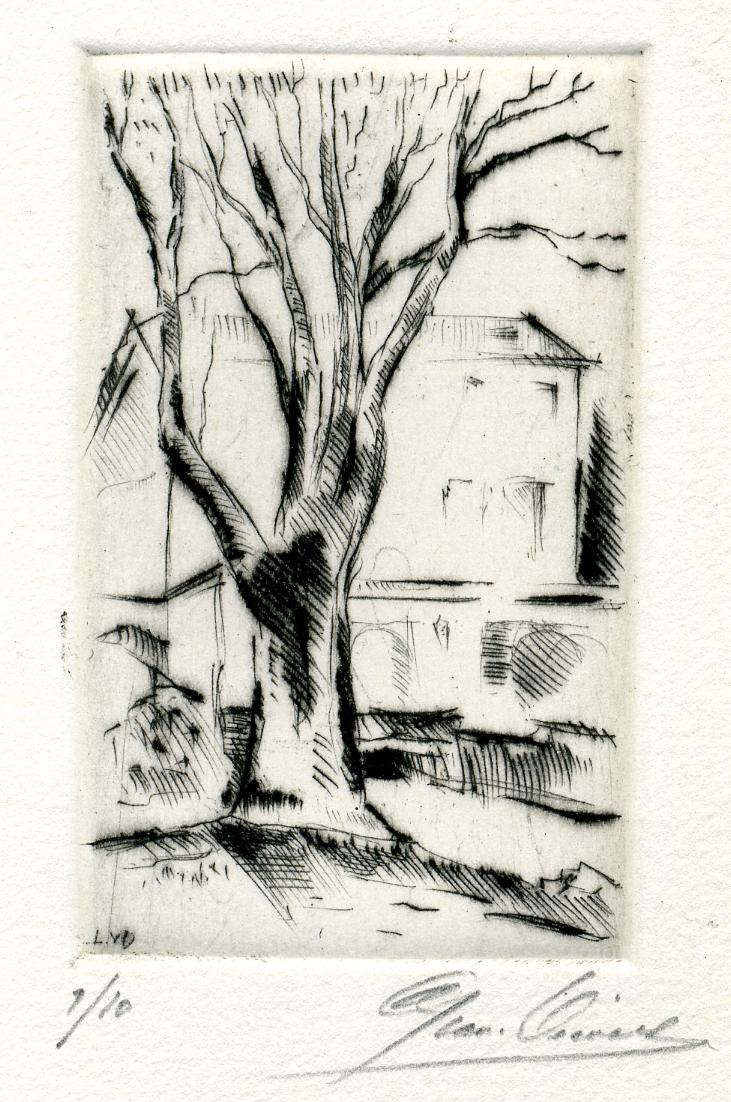
"Les Roches" in Linkebeek, home of Lismonde and current headquarters of the Lismonde Foundation, drypoint by Léon van Dievoet, 1964.

== See also ==
- Belgian pavilion of the Venice Biennale
