= Adam Pendleton =

American conceptual artist (born 1984)

- Born: 1984 (age 41–42); Richmond, Virginia
- Known for: Conceptual Art, Collage, Painting, Performance, Silkscreen, Video,
- Website: www.adampendleton.net

Adam Pendleton (born 1984) is an American conceptual artist known for his multi-disciplinary practice, involving painting, silkscreen, collage, video, performance, and word art. His work often involves the investigation of language and the recontextualization of history through appropriated imagery.

His art has been shown at the Museum of Modern Art, the Whitney, the New Museum, and other shows internationally, including La Triennale at the Palais de Tokyo in Paris. He has been featured twice in Forbes Magazine's "30 Under 30" list. In 2024, he received the Rosenthal Family Foundation Award for Painting from the American Academy of Arts and Letters.

The artist splits his time between New York City and Germantown, New York.

== Early life ==
Pendleton was born in 1984, Richmond, Virginia. His father is a musician and contractor, and his mother is a retired elementary schoolteacher. He has an older brother and a younger sister. At an early age, he started writing poetry, and later began painting in his basement. He finished high school two years early, and for college he attended the Artspace Independent Study Program in Peitrasanta, Italy. After art studies, he went to New York in 2002, at the age of 18, with the intention of becoming an artist.

== Approach ==
In an interview with Bomb magazine, Thom Donovan describes Adam Pendleton as "a rare artist in his ability to synthesize disciplines and mediums, and to steer with collaborators toward 'total works,' which yet remain drafts of a larger essayistic practice. His works—like those of his many avant-garde forebears—are experimental in the truest sense. He sets up a laboratory in which our social and political desires can appear, however fleetingly. ...With Pendleton's work, even though we are often left with aporias and blind spots, we feel the force of historical matter self-organizing and finding form beyond representability and essence."

Pendleton often juxtaposes imagery, language, music and concepts from a variety of subjects such as philosophy and important historical movements, creating complex work that allows for multiple interpretations. He has often focused on significant moments in Black American history such as the Civil Rights Movement of the 1960s, and the recent Black Lives Matter movement that emerged following the killing of Trayvon Martin.

== Career and work ==
In 2004, Pendleton landed his first solo show, Being Here at Wallspace in Manhattan. In 2005 he joined the Yvon Lambert Gallery and presented Deeper Down There. The show featured two-color canvases with silkscreened lines from modern African-American literature and music, as well as paintings resembling enlarged record album covers. The New York Times wrote that Pendleton "takes a coolly intellectual approach to hot subject matter". It likened his work to that of Glenn Ligon, Lawrence Weiner and Ed Ruscha, and praised it for its "provocative reticence."

In his 2007 performance piece, The Revival, the artist, dressed in a white tuxedo jacket, black pants and bright green shoes, gave a sermon while accompanied by a 30-person gospel choir. Pendleton's homily, titled "a dream of an uncommon language," featured language borrowed from poets such as John Ashbery, Charles Bernstein and Donald Hall, as well as "politico-speak and strident gay protest". Also included in the revival were "testimonials" from contemporary artist Liam Gillick and poet Jena Osman. Writing of the performance The New York Times art critic Roslyn Sulcas described Mr. Pendleton as "the most charismatic performer I've seen on stage for a long time." The piece was part of Performa 07 and was performed at Stephan Weiss studio.

The 2009 video installation BAND tracks the process of the band Deerhoof as they develop and record a new song, I Did Crimes for You. The video is loosely based on Godard's film Sympathy for the Devil, which features The Rolling Stones recording their song of the same name. In BAND, footage of Deerhoof rehearsing is edited to include fragments from a 1971 documentary, Teddy, about a young member of the Black Panther Party in Los Angeles. The song's lyrics consist of confrontational rhetoric characteristic of the late 1960s, while the voiceover from the documentary speaks of the prospects of change and the efficacy of such violence. Speaking of the video's relationship to Godard's film, Pendleton has said "it is not something that exists in its shadow, but rather in contrast to it."

In 2010, Pendleton was featured in MoMA PS1's Greater New York exhibition. His installation, The Abolition of Alienated Labor, included drawings and images appropriated from the 1950s African independence movement and from a 1960s Godard film, silk-screened onto large mirrors. The title of the work comes from a 1963 Situationist work in which Guy Debord painted that phrase over an industrially produced painting by Giuseppe Pinot-Gallizio. The artist explains that "the works are framed within the context of the ethos of experimental gestures, the potential of a political framework—or rather, of a politicized framework."

"Black Dada" is a concept that informs much of the artist's work. There is no explicit definition but the artist has described the idea as "a way to talk about the future while talking about the past. It is our present moment." The Black Dada series of paintings contain a partial view of Sol LeWitt's cube sculptures, accompanied by one or more letters derived from the phrase "Black Dada." The phrase comes from the 1964 poem "Black Dada Nihilismus" by Amiri Baraka. Pendleton states that the two words merge two ideas: "Dada, meaning 'yes, yes' and black as an open-ended signifier." In 2011, Pendleton's Black Dada (LK/LC/AA) was acquired by The Museum of Modern Art.

System of Display is a series of works involving mirrors, letters and silkscreened images appropriated from art publications and other books. The images include photographs of the Fridericianum during the 1955 Documenta and of a couple dancing in the street during a celebration of independence in Congo, as well as stills of Anna Karina from Jean-Luc Godard's film Made in U.S.A.. Pendleton has said, "I am working to establish a system of display, of organization. I want to create a situation where we're inclined to rethink notions of the past and the future, as well as our ability to understand them enough to make reductive statements."

Becoming Imperceptible opened at the Contemporary Arts Center in New Orleans in 2016, and traveled to MOCA Cleveland and MCA Denver. Its name comes from the philosophical writing of Gilles Deleuze and Félix Guattari. Becoming Imperceptible aims to create a "counter-portitrature" by blending the approaches of the historical avant garde with historical Black movements. The effect is the merging of disparate ideas, people and imagery, collectively blending and engaging each other in the space of art.

In 2017, Pendleton published the Black Dada Reader, a sourcebook containing photocopied texts by Haryette Mullen, Gertrude Stein, Sun Ra, Hugo Ball, Stokely Carmichael, Ad Reinhardt, Joan Retallack, Ron Silliman, Adrian Piper, and many others, as well as newly commissioned essays from several writers and curators. The book was named one of the best art books of 2017 by the New York Times.

In 2020, Pendleton created a unique and provocative cover for The New York Times Magazine's July 4 edition which featured a Frederick Douglass speech with imagery overlaid, suggesting a disconnect with America's promise of freedom versus its continued post-slavery caste system.

== Art market ==
In 2012, Pendleton signed with Pace Gallery at age 28, the youngest artist to do so since the 1970s. His first show with Pace was at the gallery's Soho London branch in the fall of 2012.

Since 2020, Pendleton has also been working with David Kordansky Gallery in Los Angeles. Famous collectors include Steven A. Cohen, Leonardo DiCaprio and Venus Williams.

In 2023, Pendleton and Venus Williams curated a charity auction hosted by Pace Gallery. Co-organized with Sotheby's, proceeds will support a preservation project for the childhood home of Nina Simone. Pendleton jointly purchased Simone's childhood home in 2017 along with Ellen Gallagher, Rashid Johnson, and Julie Mehretu.

== Other activities ==
- Drawing Center, Member of the Board of Directors (since 2020)
- Institute for Contemporary Art at VCU, Member of the advisory board (since 2019)

== Personal ==
Pendleton came out to his mother in 1999. In 2015, he married Karsten Ch’ien, a food entrepreneur.

== Exhibitions ==
=== Selected solo exhibitions ===
- Adam Pendleton: Some Wild Kind of Language, Stedelijk Museum Amsterdam (2026-2027)
- Adam Pendleton: Love, Queen, Hirshhorn Museum (2025-2027)
- Adam Pendleton: To Divide By, Mildred Lane Kemper Art Museum, St. Louis, Missouri (2023-2024)
- Adam Pendleton. Blackness, White, and Light, Museum Moderner Kunst Stiftung Ludwig Wien (2023-2024)
- Adam Pendleton: Who is Queen?, MoMA (2021–2022)
- Adam Pendleton, Le Consortium (2020)
- List Projects: Adam Pendleton, MIT List Visual Arts Center (2018)
- Adam Pendleton: shot him in the face, Baltic Centre for Contemporary Art (2017); KW Institute for Contemporary Art (2017)
- Becoming Imperceptible, Museum of Contemporary Art Cleveland (2017); Museum of Contemporary Art Denver (2016); Contemporary Arts Center (New Orleans) (2016)
- Radio (ONE), Salina Art Center (2011)
- Adam Pendleton: BAND, The Kitchen (2010)
- Adam Pendleton: EL T D K Amsterdam: Part I: three scenes (performance), Kunstverein, Amsterdam (2009); Part II: grey-blue grain (exhibition), Kunstverein, Amsterdam (2010); Part III: BAND (film screening) (2009)
- Being Here, Wallspace, Manhattan (2004)

=== Selected group exhibitions ===
- Imagining Black Diasporas: 21st-Century Art and Poetics, Los Angeles County Museum of Art (2024–2025)
- Whitney Biennial 2022: Quiet as It’s Kept, Whitney Museum of American Art (2022)
- Public Movement: On Art, Politics, and Dance, Moderna Museet (2017)
- I am you, you are too, Walker Art Center (2017)
- How to Live Together, Kunsthalle Wien (2017)
- The Eighth Climate (What does art do?), 11th Gwangju Biennale (2016)
- The Language of Things, Public Art Fund, City Hall Park, New York (2016)
- Personne et les autres, Belgian Pavilion, 56th International Art Exhibition, La Biennale di Venezia (2015)
- Radical Presence: Black Performance in Contemporary Art, Yerba Buena Center for the Arts (2015); Walker Art Center (2014); Studio Museum in Harlem (2013); Contemporary Arts Museum Houston (2013)
- Ecstatic Alphabets/Heaps of Language, Museum of Modern Art (2012)
- La Triennale 2012: Intense Proximity, Palais de Tokyo (2012)
- Greater New York 2010, P.S.1 Contemporary Art Center (2010)
- Afro-Modernism: Journeys through the Black Atlantic, Tate Liverpool (2010)
- Talk Show, Institute of Contemporary Arts, London (2009)
- The Generational: Younger Than Jesus, New Museum of Contemporary Art (2009)
- Performa 07: The Second Biennial of New Visual Art Performance (2007)
- Sympathy for the Devil: Art and Rock and Roll Since 1967, Museum of Contemporary Art, Chicago (2007)

== Selected public collections ==
- Carnegie Museum of Art, Pittsburgh
- Solomon R. Guggenheim Museum, New York
- Museum of Art, Rhode Island School of Design, Providence
- Museum of Contemporary Art, Chicago
- Museum of Contemporary Art, San Diego
- The Museum of Modern Art, New York
- Studio Museum in Harlem, New York
- Tate, London
- University of Chicago, Illinois
- Houghton Library, Harvard University
