= Luc Indestege =

Luc Indestege was born in Zonhoven on 5 February 1901 and died in Brussels on 11 July 1974. He was a Dutch-speaking Belgian poet and prose writer.

== Life ==
Indestege studied Germanic philology at the Catholic University of Louvain and obtained his doctorate in 1925 based on his thesis about Henriette Roland Holst. He began his career as a teacher at the Athénée royal de Bruxelles (Collegium Theresianum) and then became a teaching assistant for the Dutch language at the University of Padua between 1952 and 1956.

== His literary accomplishment ==
His melancholy verses made him famous as a poet. He also translated into Dutch from French, Latin and Italian. The texts were written by many foreign writers and poets such as Louise Labé and the Goliards. He also published surveys about Italian literature.

In 1942 he was awarded the Auguste Beernaert Prize for his poetry collection Orpheus and Eurudike (Orphée and Eurydice).

== Publications ==
- Vale dicere, 1932 (collection of poems)
- Andioenora, 1934
- Rondom Erasmus' Lof der zotheid, 1937 (essay)
- De zeven hoofdzonden, 1938
- Orpheus en Eurudike, 1941 (collection of poems)
- XXIV Sonnetten, 1945 (translation of the work of Louise Labé)
- Het geschil tussen dwaasheid en liefde, 1946
- Estuans intrinsecus, 1950 (translation of the Goliards)
- Quaderno Fiorentino, Indrukken en gesprekken, 1951 (study of Italian literature)
- De Jonge Leopardi, 1957
- Kroniek der Italiaanse letteren, 1961
- Laïs, Lyrisch spel in drie bedrijven, 1964
- Giovanni Papini, 1968
- Iets is voorgoed voorbij, 1976 (posthumously published)

== Portraits ==
There are several portraits of Luc Indestege by the painter Jules Lismonde:

- Portrait of Luc Indestege, charcoal pencil on paper, 970x650mm (catalogue raisonné n°830)
- Sketch for a portrait of Luc Indestege, 1944, graphite on paper, 162x111mm (Maison Lismonde’s collection, Linkebeek) (cat. 922)
- Portrait of Luc Indetedge, 1951, charcoal pencilon paper, 1020x820 mm. (cat. 1476)
- Portrait of Luc Indestedge, 1952 (Maison Lismonde’ collection, Linkebeek), (cat. 1514)
