= Belgian pavilion =

Venice Biennale national pavilion

Coordinates: 45.4296°N 12.3577°E

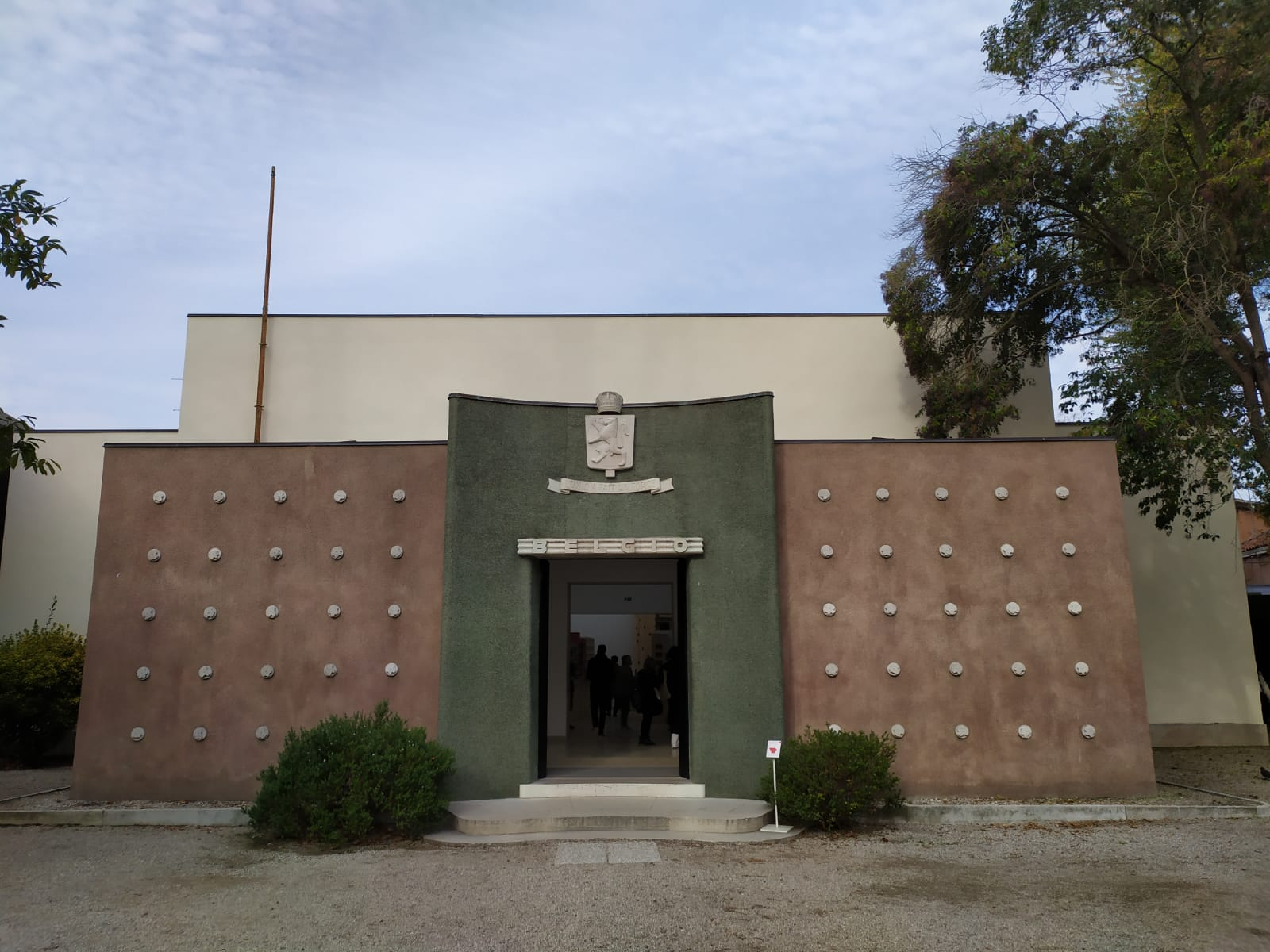
Façade of the Belgian pavilion

The Belgian pavilion houses Belgium's national representation during the Venice Biennale arts festivals.

== Background ==
The Venice Biennale is an international art biennial exhibition held in Venice, Italy. Often described as "the Olympics of the art world", participation in the Biennale is a prestigious event for contemporary artists. The festival has become a constellation of shows: a central exhibition curated by that year's artistic director, national pavilions hosted by individual nations, and independent exhibitions held throughout Venice. The Biennale's parent organisation also runs regular festivals in other arts: architecture, dance, film, music and theatre.

Outside the central international exhibition, individual nations produce their own shows, known as pavilions, as their national representation. Nations that own their pavilion buildings – such as the 30 housed in the Giardini – are responsible for their own upkeep and construction costs as well. Nations without dedicated buildings create pavilions in venues throughout the city.

== Organization and building ==
The Belgian pavilion was the first foreign pavilion built on the Giardini. Architect Léon Sneyers designed the building for its 1907 construction in an Art Nouveau style with the influence of Josef Hoffmann and Viennese architecture. The pavilion was expanded by A. de Bosschère between 1929 and 1930 with rooms added on both sides of the main exhibition space. He also converted the flat roof from a pitch. Later, the pavilion was twice restored: in 1948 by Virgilio Vallot, who also made its façade concave with rosette motifs, and in 1997 by Georges Baines, who converted the space to a white cube gallery.

== Representation by year ==
=== Art ===
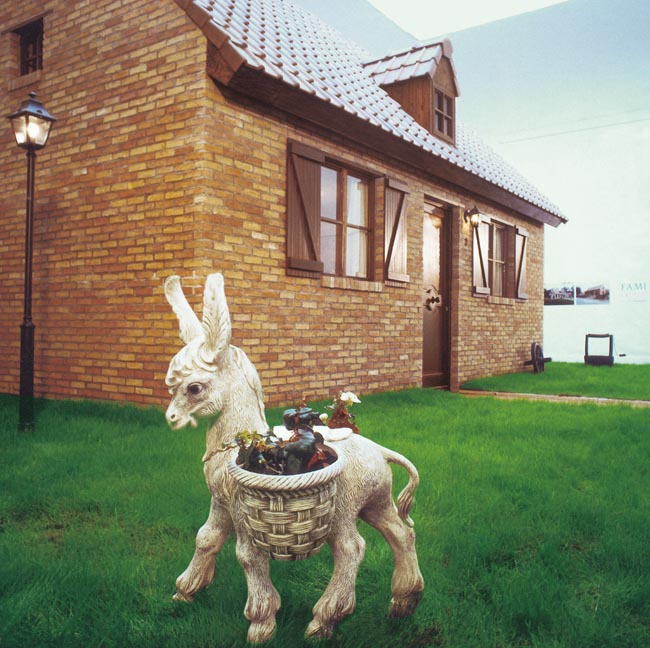
"Fami-Home" installation by Guillaume Bijl, 1988

- 1948 — Louis Buisseret, James Ensor, Constant Permeke, Louis Van Lint
- 1958 — Jules Lismonde (winner of the Renato Carrain Prize)
- 1964 — Vic Gentils
- 1972 — Pierre Alechinsky and Christian Dotremont
- 1988 — Guillaume Bijl, Narcisse Tordoir and Laurent Busine, (curator : Jan Hoet )
- 1990 — Among Others, shared exhibition I.C.W the pavilion of the Netherlands
- 1993 — Jan Vercruysse (curator : Jan Debbaut)
- 1995 — Didier Vermeiren, (curator : Jan Hoet )
- 1997 — Thierry de Cordier
- 1999 — Michel François, Ann Veronica Janssens
- 2001 — Luc Tuymans
- 2003 — Sylvie Eyberg, Valérie Mannaerts
- 2005 — Honoré d'O
- 2007 — Éric Duyckaerts, Berlinde de Bruyckere
- 2009 — Jef Geys (Curator: Dirk Snauwaert)
- 2011 — Angel Vergara, Luc Tuymans
- 2013 — Berlinde de Bruyckere (Curator: J. M. Coetzee)
- 2015 — Vincent Meessen and guests (Mathieu K. Abonnenc, Sammy Baloji, James Beckett, Melle Nieling, Elisabetta Benassi, Patrick Bernier & Olive Martin, Tamar Guimarães & Kasper Akhøj, Maryam Jafri, Adam Pendleton) (Curator: Katerina Gregos)
- 2017 — Dirk Braeckman (Curator: Eva Wittocx)
- 2019 — Jos de Gruyter & Harald Thys (Curator: Anne-Claire Schmitz)
- 2022 — Francis Alÿs (Curator: Hilde Teerlinck)

== Architecture ==
- 2004 — "Commissioner: Flemish Community". Curator: Moritz Küng.
- 2008 — "1907...After the party".
- 2010 — "Usus/usures". Curator: Rotor.
- 2012 — "The Ambition of the Territory". Curator: AWJGGRAUaDVVTAT.
- 2014 — "Intérieurs. Notes et Figures". Curators: Sébastien Martinez Barat, Bernard Dubois, Sarah Levy, Judith Wielander.
- 2016 — "Bravoure". Curators: Architecten De Vylder Vinck Taillieu, Doorzon interieurarchitecten, Filip Dujardin.
- 2018 — "Eurotopie". Curator: Traumnovelle (L. Drapeaud, M. León Fanjul, J. Leya). Co-curator: Roxane Le Grelle.
- 2021 — "Composite Presence". Curators: Bovenbouw Architectuur.
- 2023 — "In Vivo". Curators: Bento et Vinciane Despret.
- 2025 — "Building Biospheres". Curators: Bas Smets, Stefano Mancuso.

== Bibliography ==
- Russeth, Andrew (April 17, 2019). "The Venice Biennale: Everything You Could Ever Want to Know". ARTnews.
- Volpi, Cristiana (2013). "Belgium". In Re Rebaudengo, Adele (ed.). Pavilions and Garden of Venice Biennale. Rome: Contrasto. p. 166. ISBN 978-88-6965-440-4.
