= Léon Van Dievoet =

Belgian architect

Léon van Dievoet K. O. Leopold, K. O. Crown
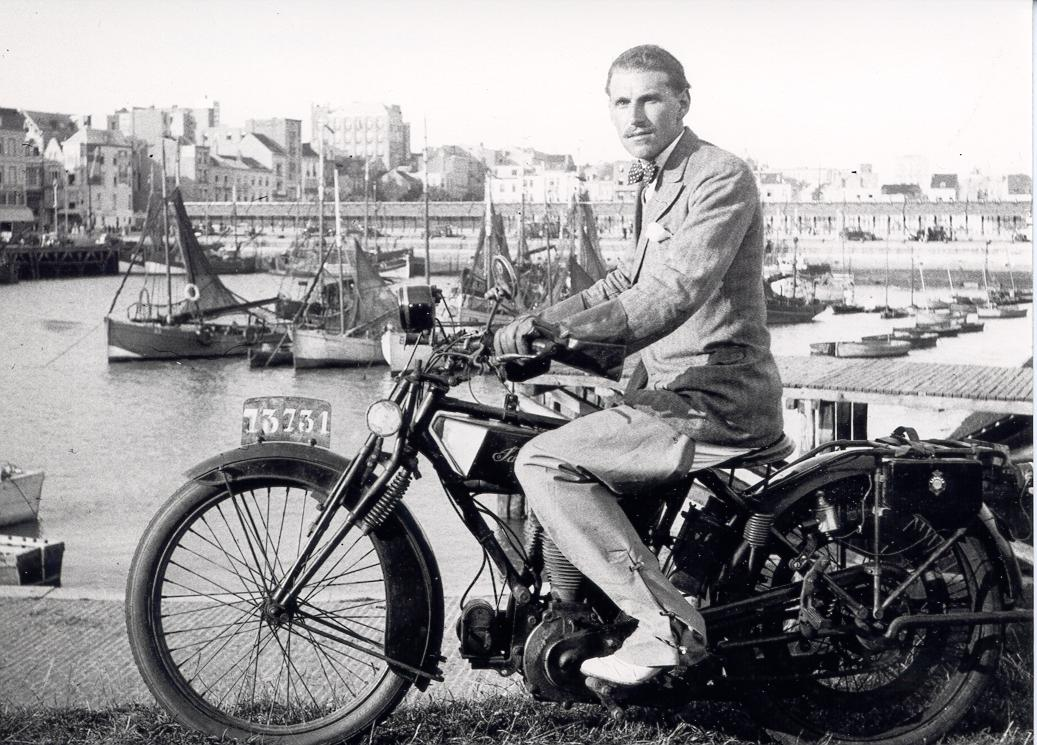
- Born: 5 July 1907; Ixelles
- Died: 6 December 1993 (aged 86); City of Brussels
- Occupations: architect, painter, engraver, and drawer.
- Father: Gabriel van Dievoet
- Family: Van Dievoet family

Léon Van Dievoet (/ˈdiːvʊt/; 5 July 1907 – 6 December 1993) was a Belgian architect, painter, engraver, and draughtsman.

He is the author of numerous drawings of places in Brussels that have since been demolished which have been described as a "mine of information for all those interested in the Brussels of yesteryear".

== Selected works ==
Drawings

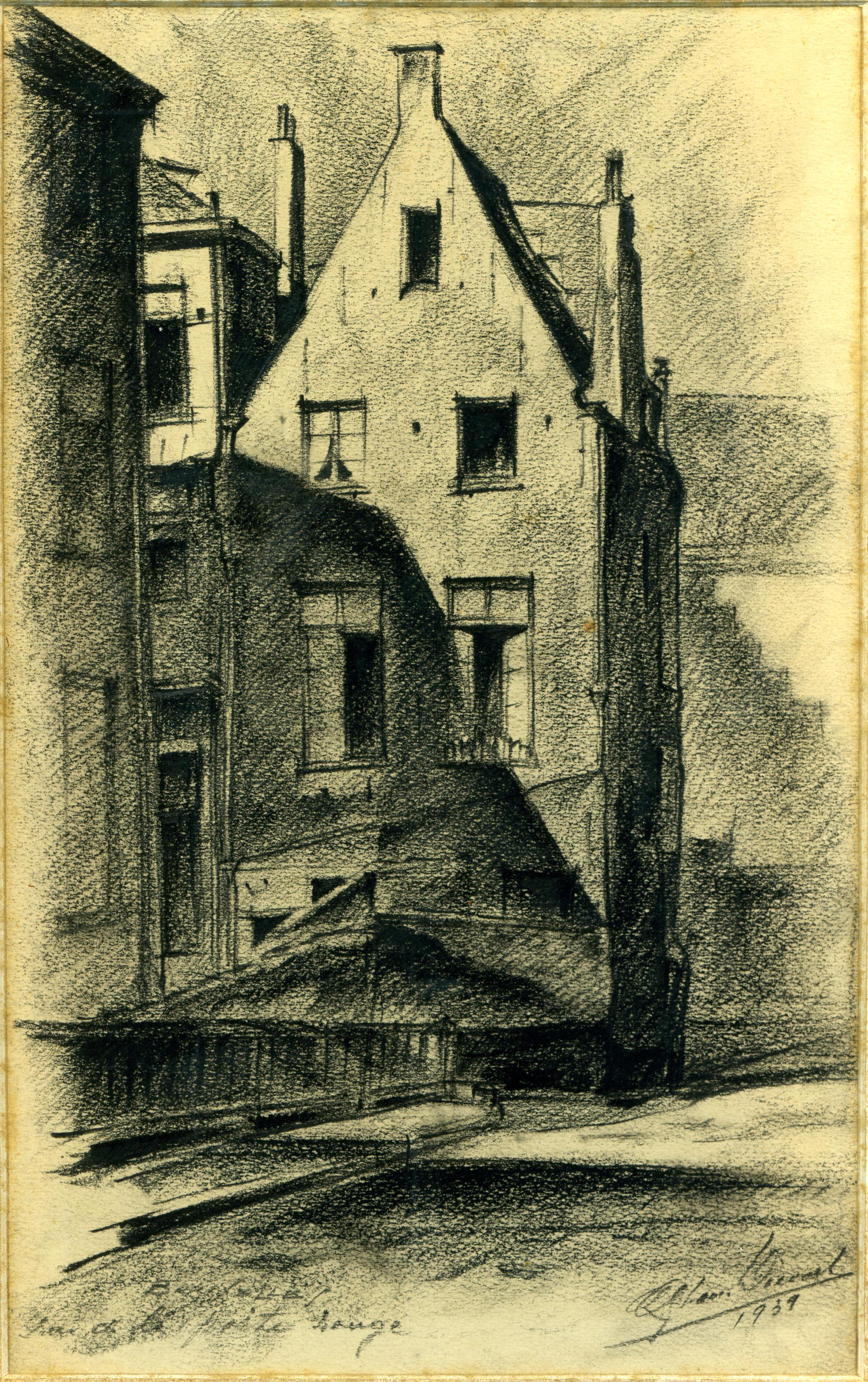
Rue de la Porte Rouge, Bruegel House, 1939

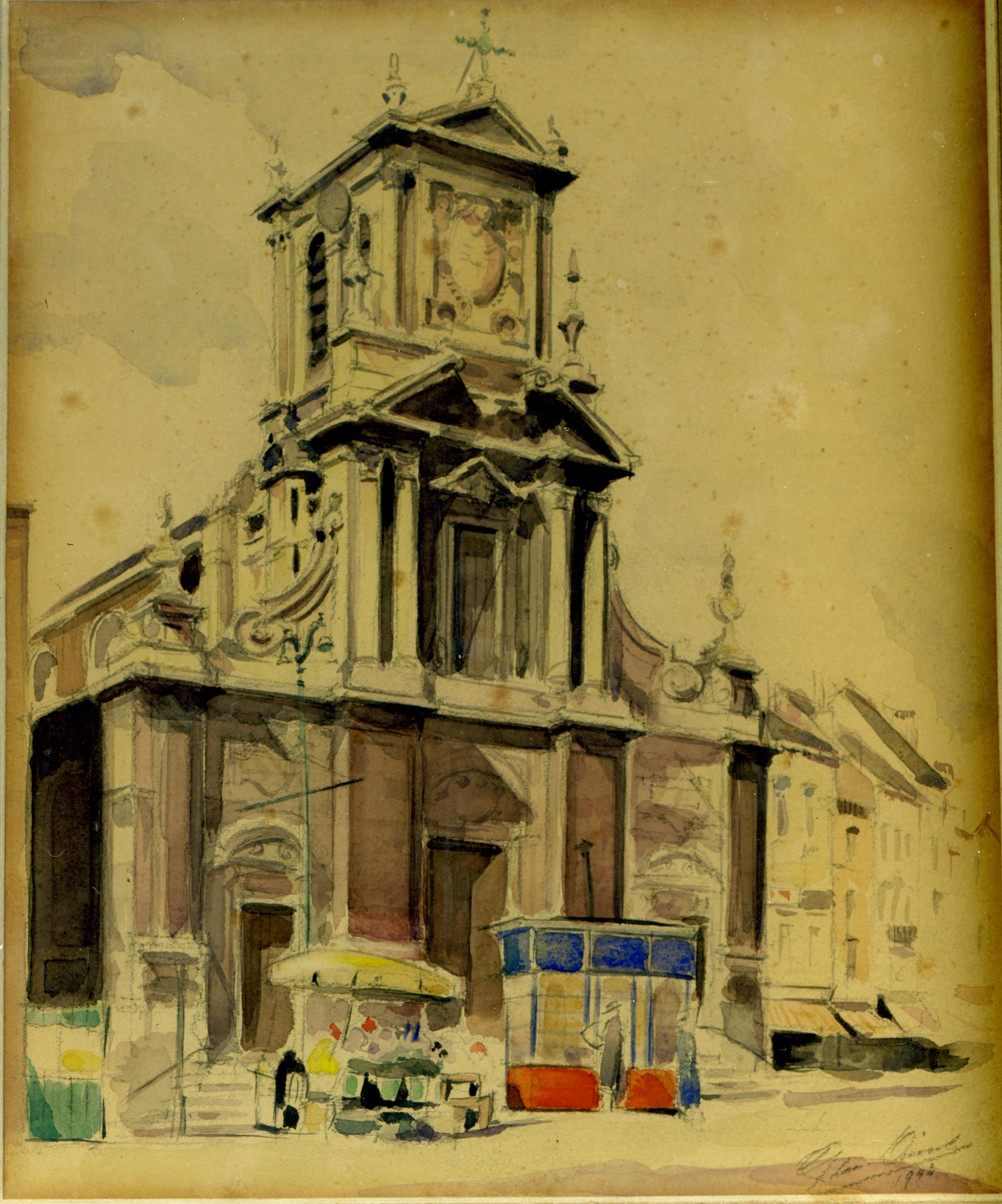
Saint-Josse Church, July 1942

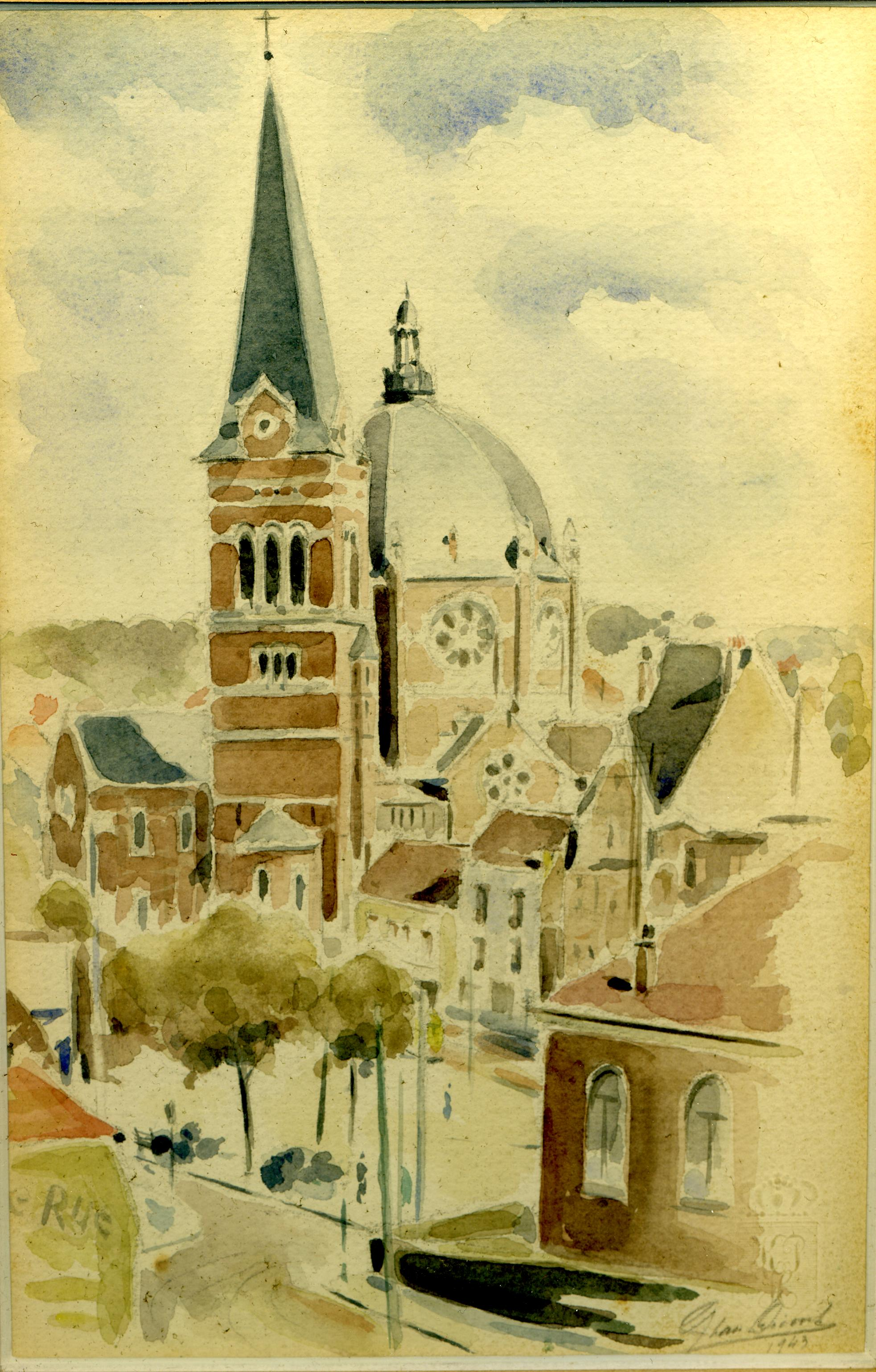
Saint-Job Church in Uccle, June 1943

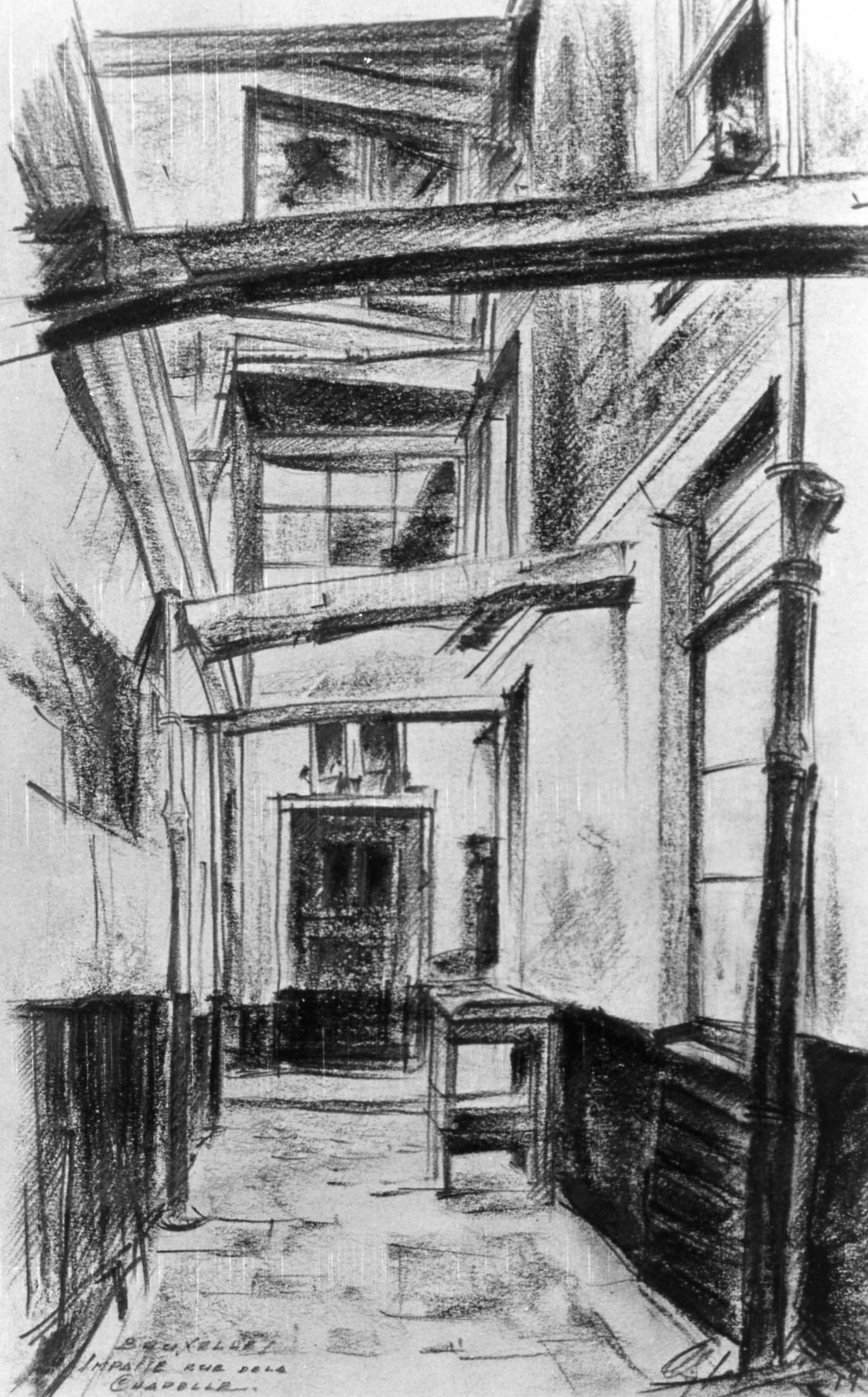
Dead end in the rue de la Chapelle, 1939

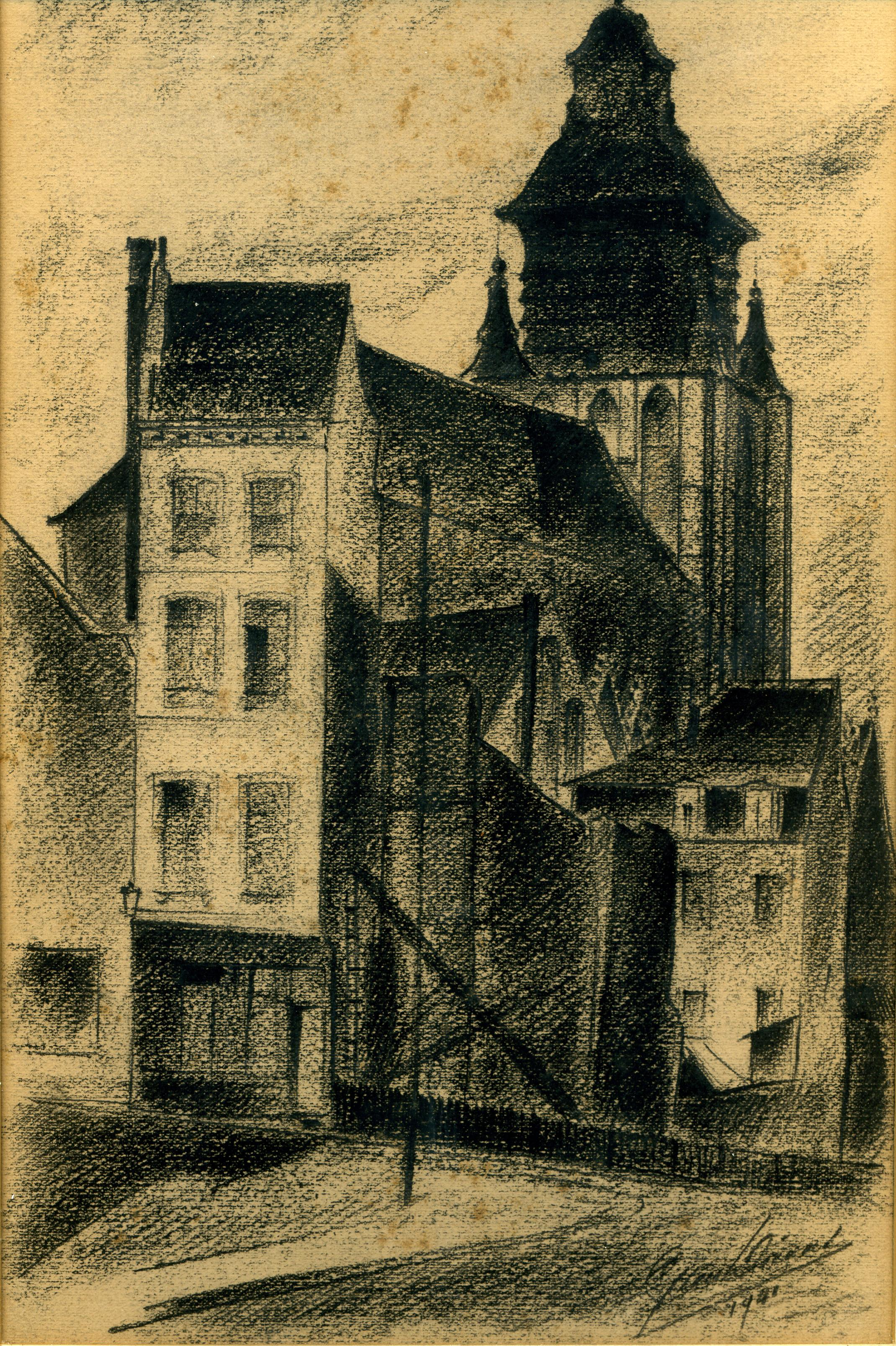
Chapel Church, April 1941
Paintings

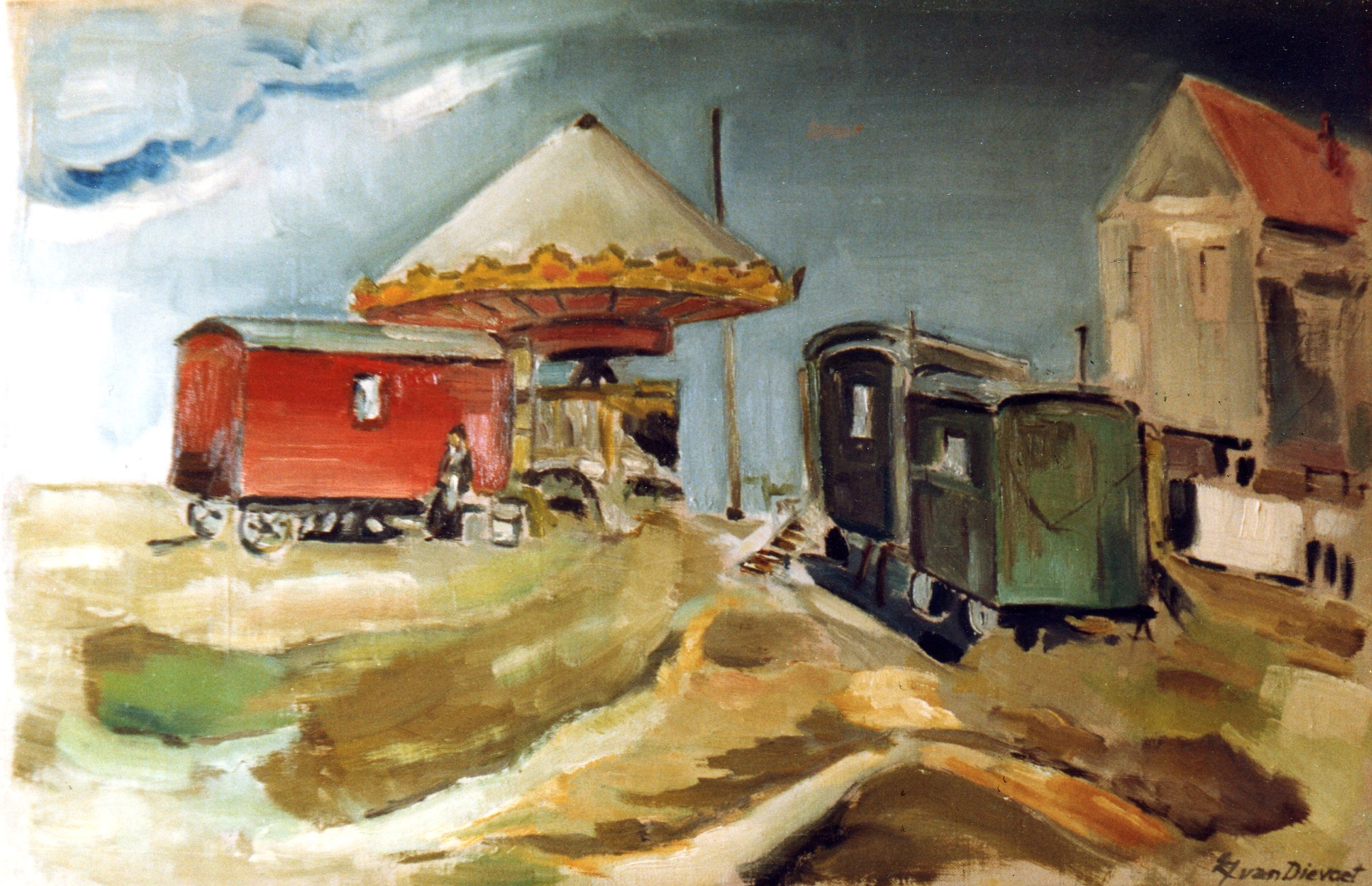
Le Carrousel, August 1939

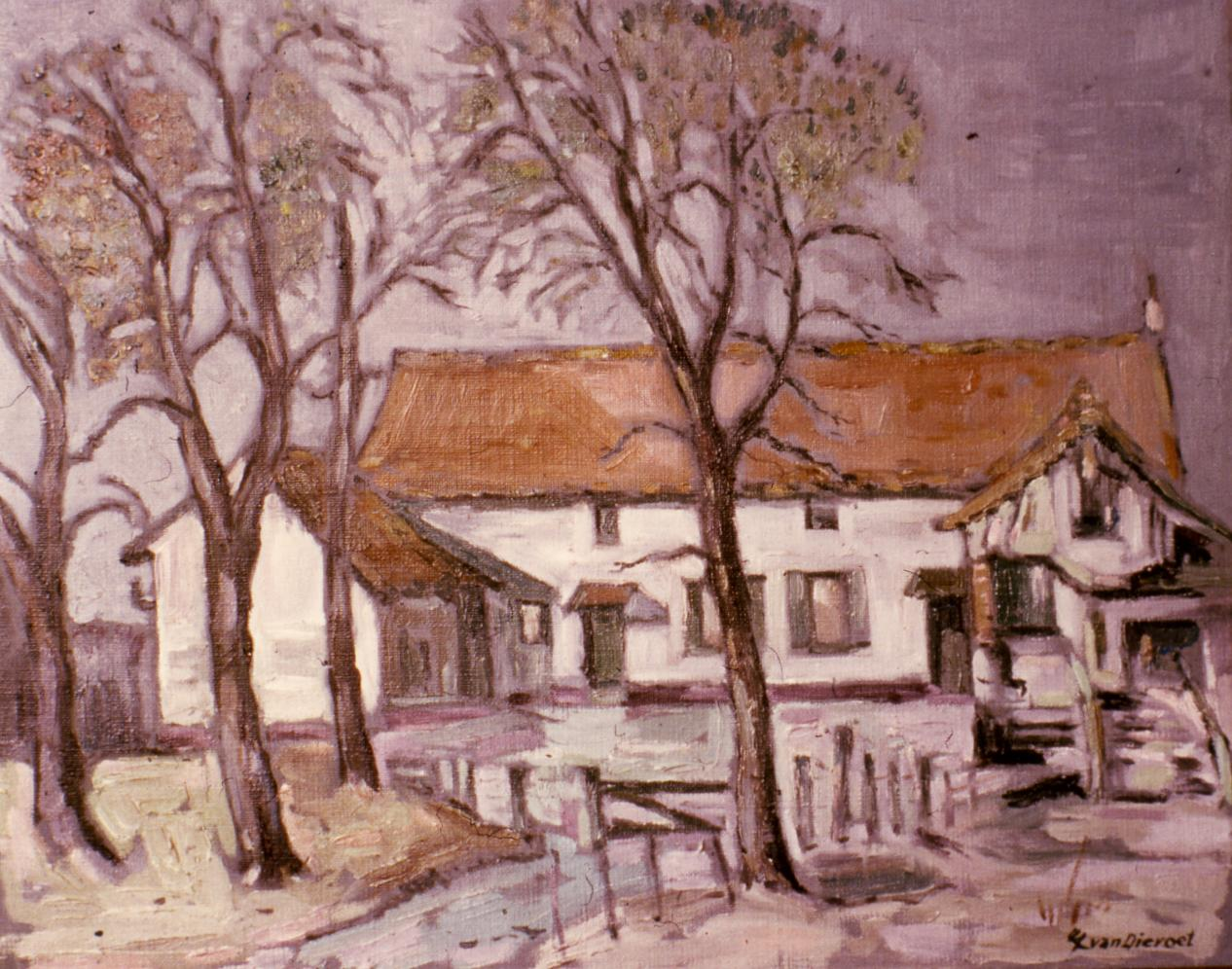
Ferme à Beersel, 1979
Architecture

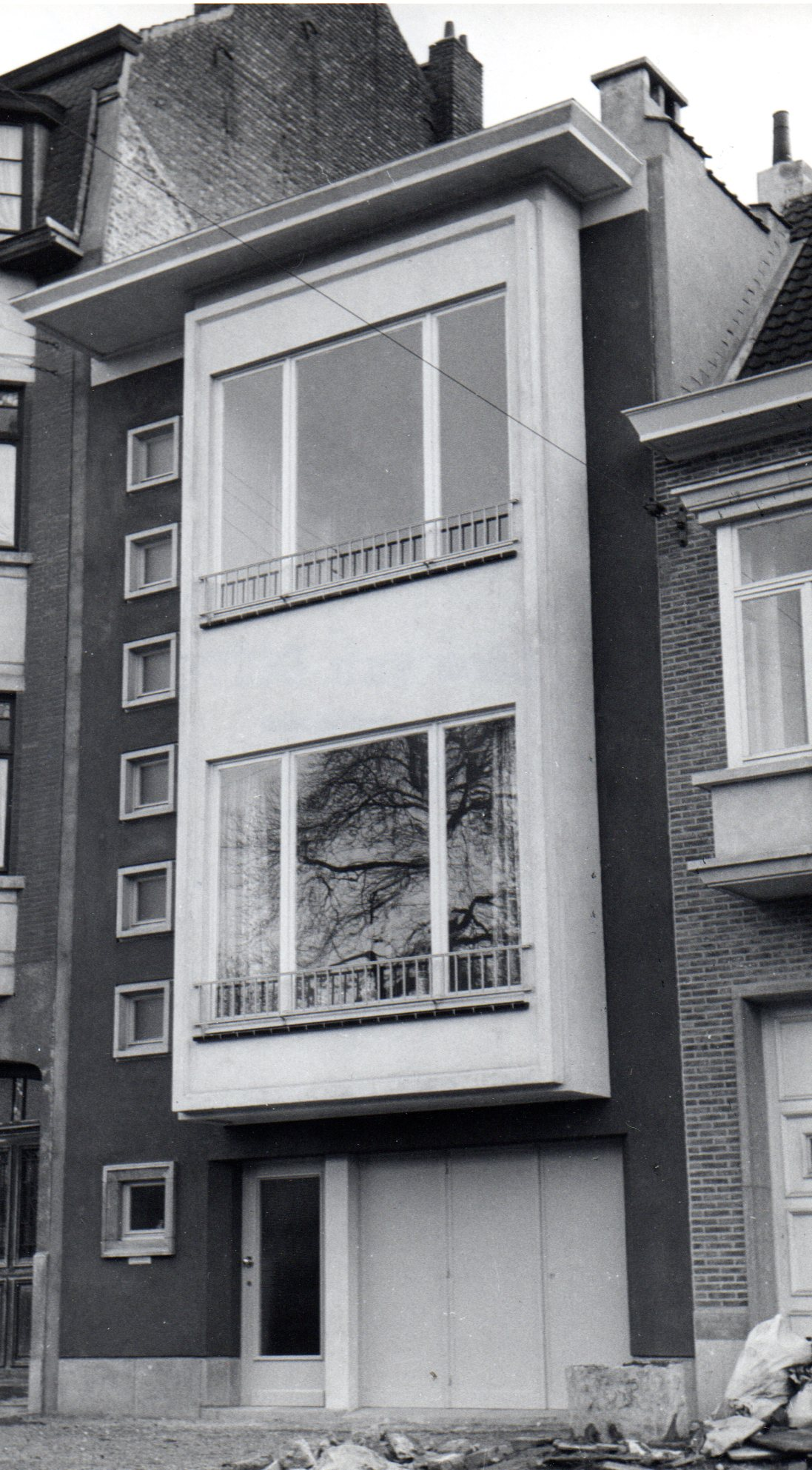
House of artist Lismonde, chaussée de Ninove, 1957

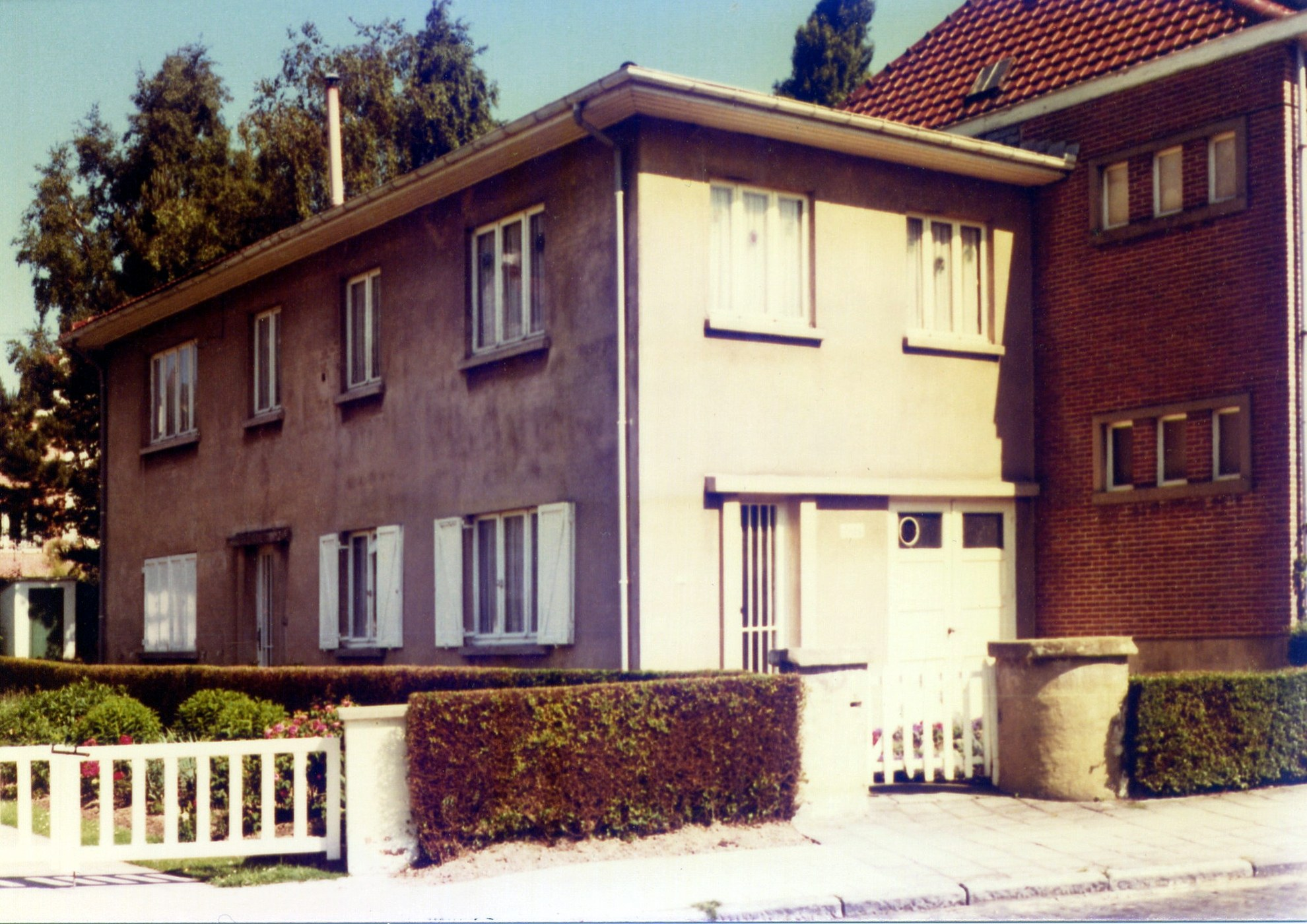
Durdut house, rue Langeveld, Uccle

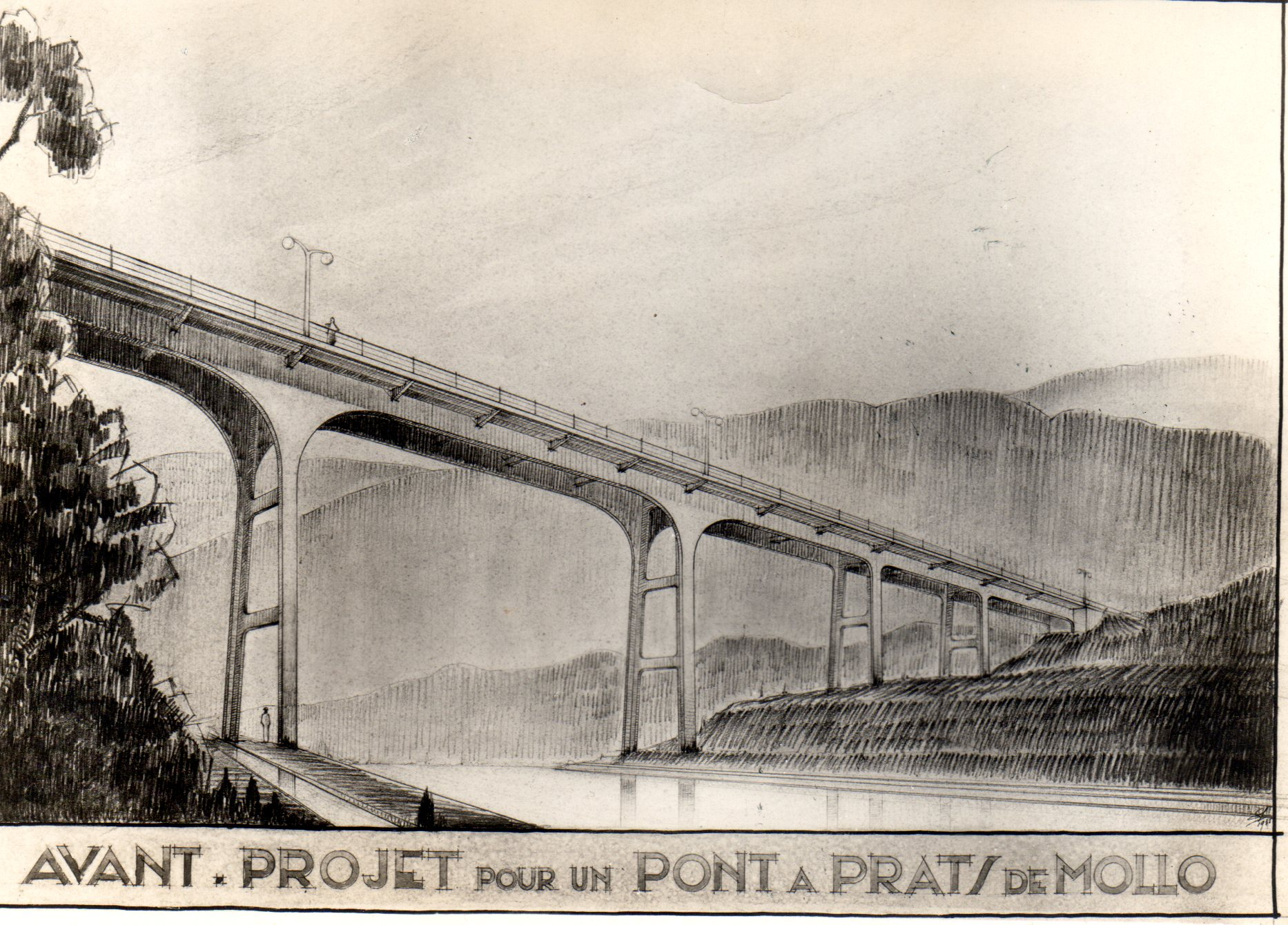
Project for a bridge in Prats de Mollo, 1935

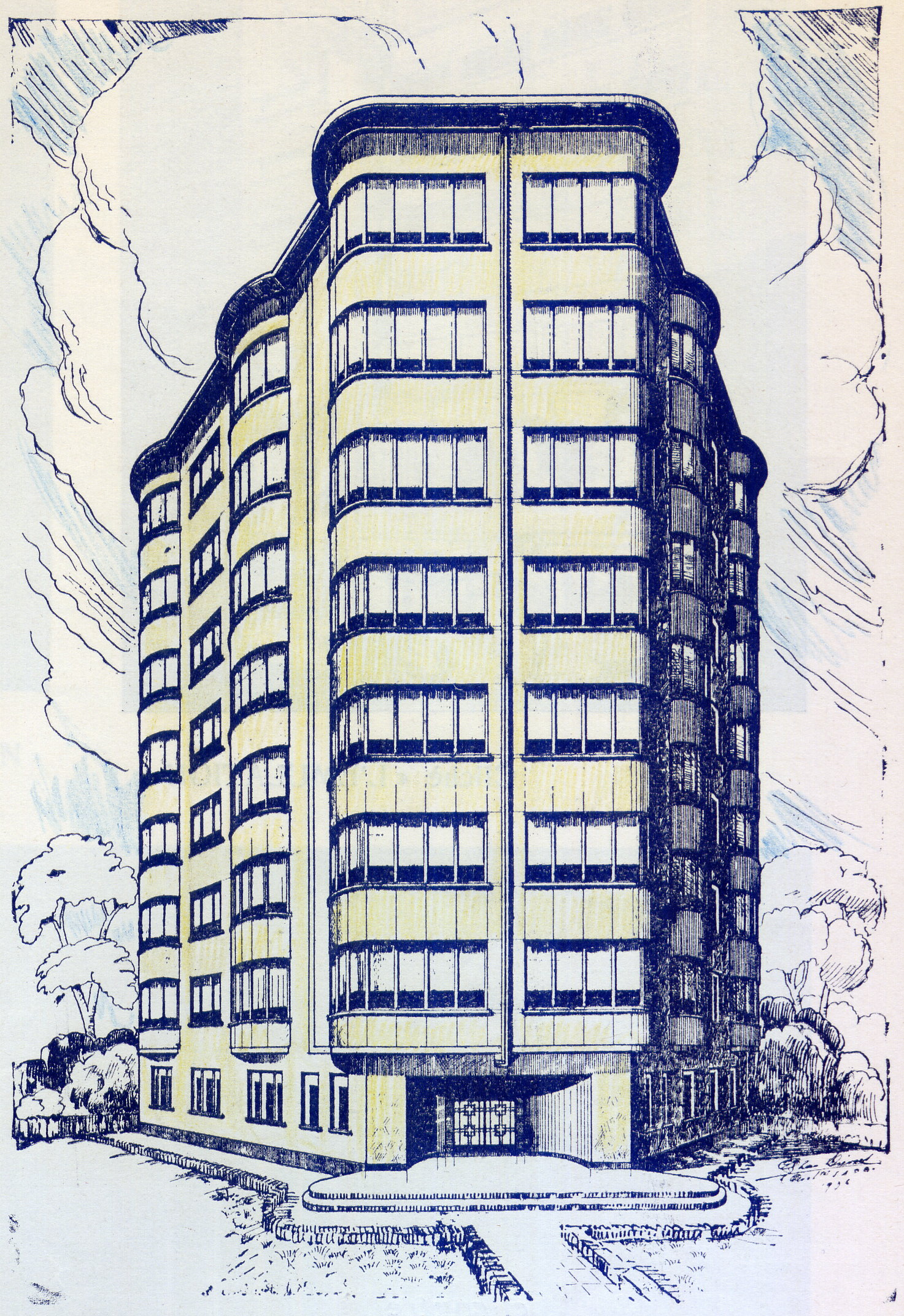
Project for a building, quartier des Nations, 1936

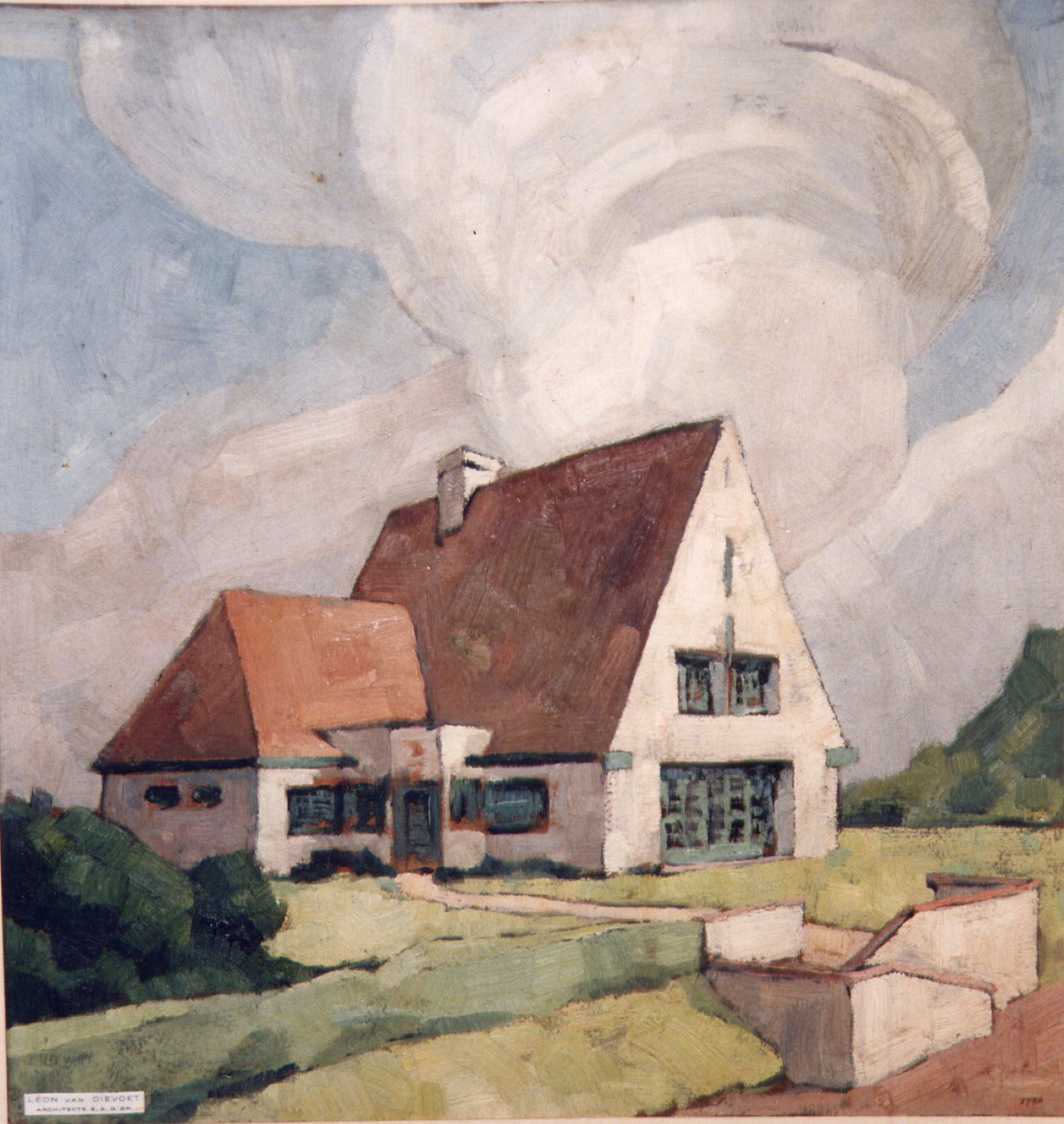
Project for a villa, 1936

== Honours ==
- Knight of the Order of Léopold
- Knight of the Order of the Crown
