= Marcel De Corte (philosopher) =

Belgian philosopher (1905–1994)

Marcel De Corte was a Belgian philosopher, a Catholic neo-Thomist and Maurrasian, born 20 April 1905, in Genappe and died on 19 June 1994, in Tilff.

After studying at the Athénée de Nivelles and obtaining a doctorate in philosophy and literature (classical philology) from the Université libre de Bruxelles in 1928, De Corte taught ancient languages for two years at the Athénée de Hannut. A winner of the university competitive examination and a Belgian government scholarship, he attended courses in Paris (École Normale Supérieure, Sorbonne, Institut catholique de Paris), then conducted research on Aristotle's manuscripts at four Italian universities.

He was appointed assistant professor at the University of Liège in July 1932, then lecturer in October 1935. He was awarded the title agrégation de l'enseignement supérieur (higher education professor) in philosophy (with a thesis on the doctrine of intelligence in Aristotle) in 1934. He became a full professor 1 January 1940, holding a chair primarily devoted to the history of ancient philosophy and moral philosophy. He taught at the University of Liège until his retirement in 1975.

A Catholic philosopher, he was particularly influenced by the thought of the master of the Action Française, Charles Maurras. He was also influenced by Jacques Maritain, whom he later opposed on the subject of "impossible anti-Semitism." Hostile to the Nouvelle théologie and dialogue with the Jews, De Corte launched a polemic in the spring of 1939 in which he sought to have Maritain's theses condemned as heresy.

This quarrel, symptomatic of an underlying Catholic anti-Judaism, had, however, barely had time to unfold when the Second World War broke out.

During the Royal Question, he was a fierce supporter of maintaining the monarchy. De Corte also wrote numerous articles in La Libre Belgique from 1950 to 1966, as well as numerous articles in the French journal Itinéraires, a traditionalist and anti-communist Catholic magazine by Jean Madiran, and in La Nation française, a royalist weekly by Pierre Boutang. In 1952, he was one of the original members of the Belgian group of the European Committee for Economic and Social Progress.

A Catholic Thomist, De Corte represents a movement that, in the light of Thomist philosophy, challenges the social developments and transformations born of the French Revolution that led to our so-called "modern" society. Egalitarianism, urbanization, globalization, and Marxism are, for him, all manifestations of the social and moral disintegration of humanity. The latter is that of the Western Christian peasant society of the Middle Ages, a society that is close to nature, hierarchical, and localist.
