= Anspach =

Anspach may refer to:

- The Anspach family
- Anspach (surname)
- Neu-Anspach, Hesse, Germany
- The former name of Ansbach, Bavaria, Germany

== See also ==
- Ansbach (disambiguation)
