= Ansbach (disambiguation) =

Ansbach is a city in Bavaria, Germany.

Ansbach may also refer to:

- Ansbach (district), in Bavaria, Germany
- Ansbach (electoral district), constituency in Bavaria, Germany
- Principality of Ansbach, principality of the Holy Roman Empire
- Ansbach (automobile), German automobile
- Ansbach (Usa), river of Hesse, Germany

== See also ==
- Anspach (disambiguation)
