= Seilles =

Seilles Seye (Walloon)
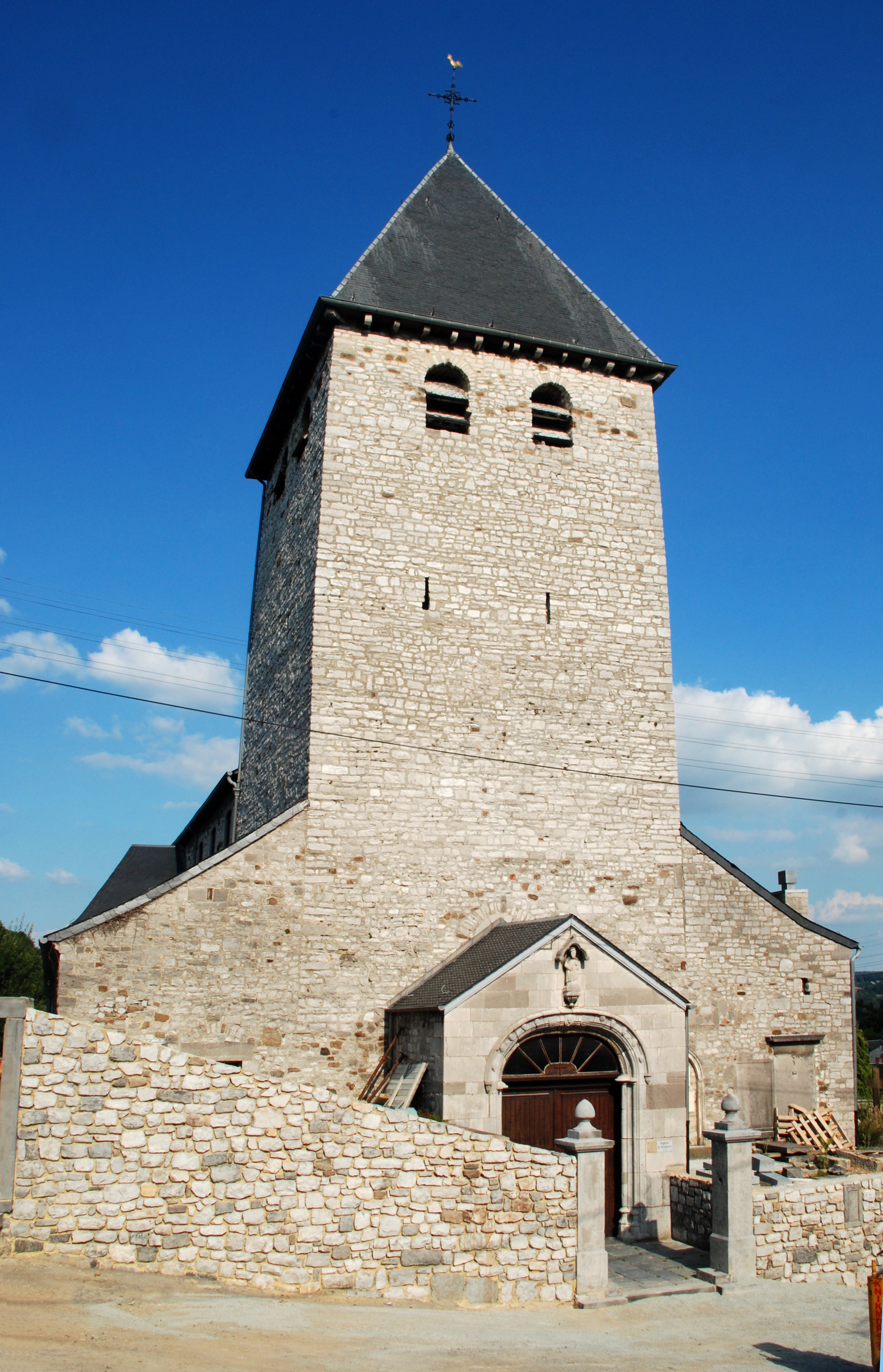
- Seilles, the village church

- Location within Belgium Location within Europe
- Coordinates: 50°30′00″N 05°04′40″E
- Country: Belgium
- Region: Wallonia
- Province: Namur
- Municipality: Andenne

Seilles (French pronunciation: [sɛj]; Walloon: Seye) is a village of Wallonia and a district of the municipality of Andenne, located in the province of Namur, Belgium.

The village church is dedicated to Saint Stephen. Its tower and nave date from the 11th century, and it contains sculptures from the 16th century as well as funerary monuments from the 17th and 18th centuries. The clergy house is from the late 18th century. In Seilles there is also a fortified farm, originally from the 14th century.
