= Château du Moisnil =

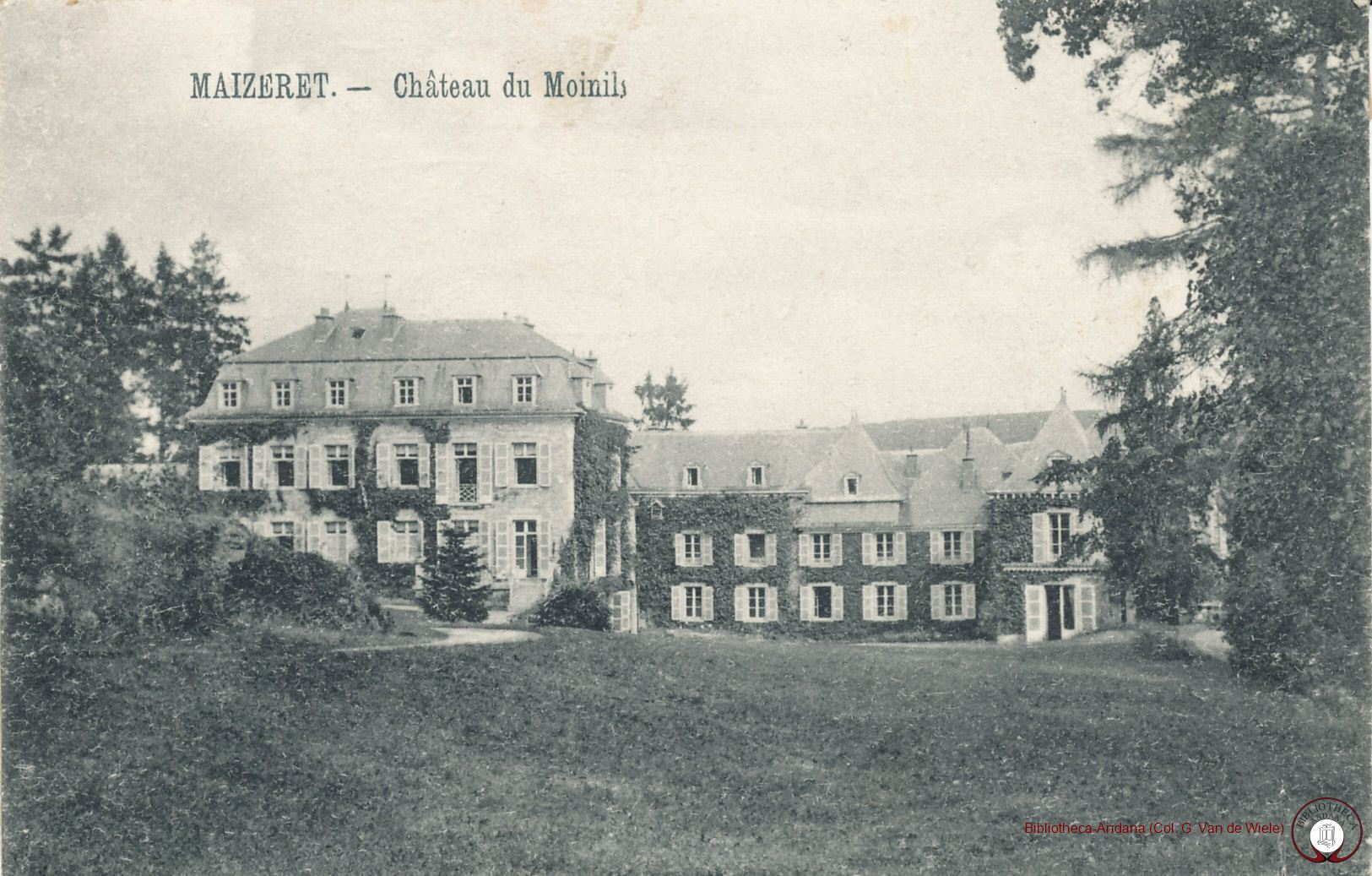
- The wing built in 1902 for Jules van Dievoet (postcard from 1921)
- Interactive map of the Château du Moisnil area

General information
- Location: Maizeret, Andenne, Namur, Wallonia, Belgium
- Coordinates: 50°27′48″N 4°58′34″E
- Renovated: 1902 for Jules Van Dievoet
- Owner: Ursel family

Height
- Architectural: Louis XV style

Renovating team
- Architect: Octave Flanneau

Website
- https://www.maizeret.be/index.php/les-chateaux/chateau-de-moisnil

The Château du Moisnil is a château or manor house of Wallonia, located in the village of Maizeret, municipality of Andenne, province of Namur, Belgium.

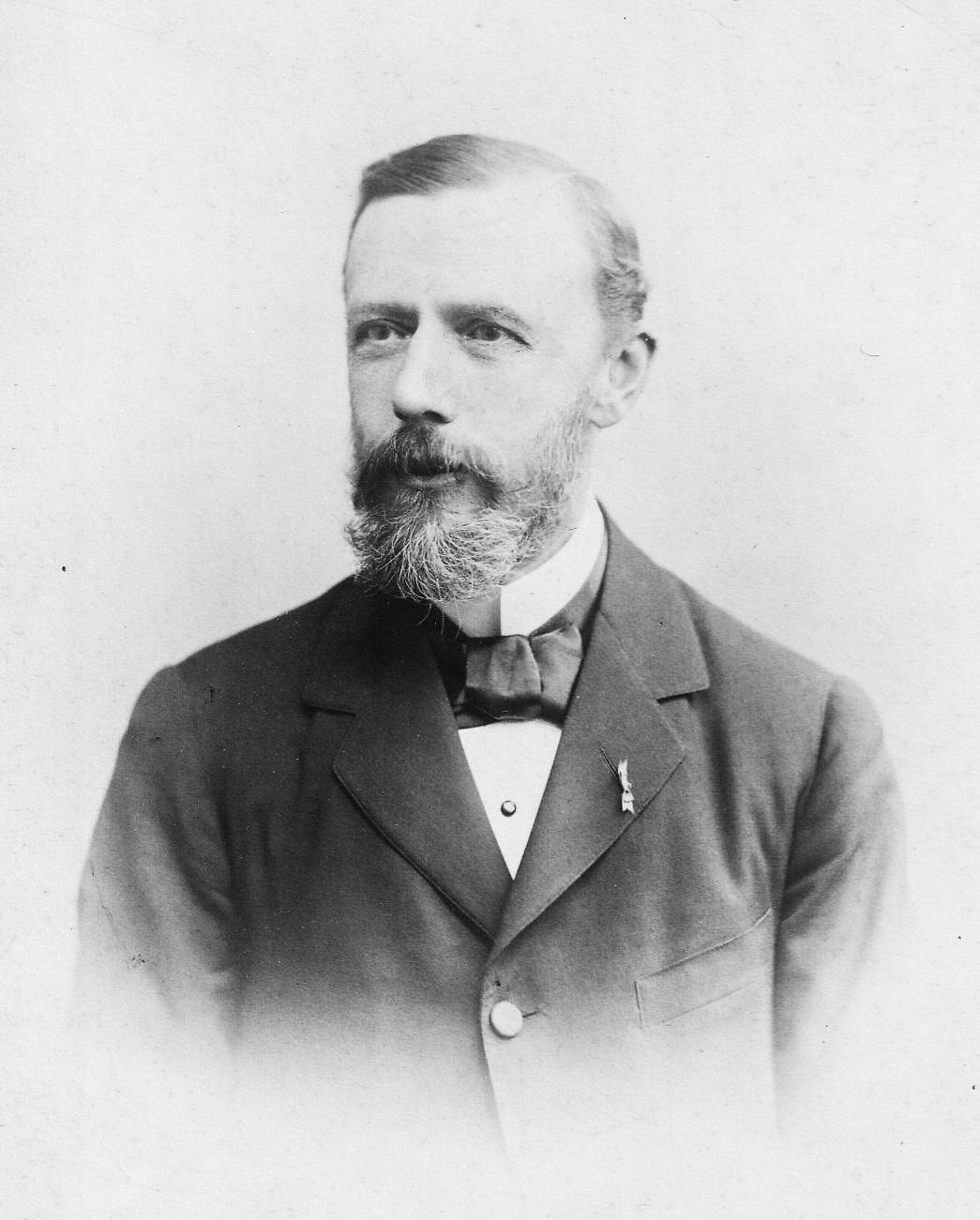
Jules van Dievoet, lawyer and past owner of the château who commissioned the only remaining part from architect Octave Flanneau

== The Château today ==
The only remaining wing was built in addition to the previous constructions in 1902 by architect Octave Flanneau (1860–1937) in Louis XV style with a mansard roof, for Jules van Dievoet, lawyer at the Belgian Supreme Court, and his wife Marguerite Anspach.

== History ==
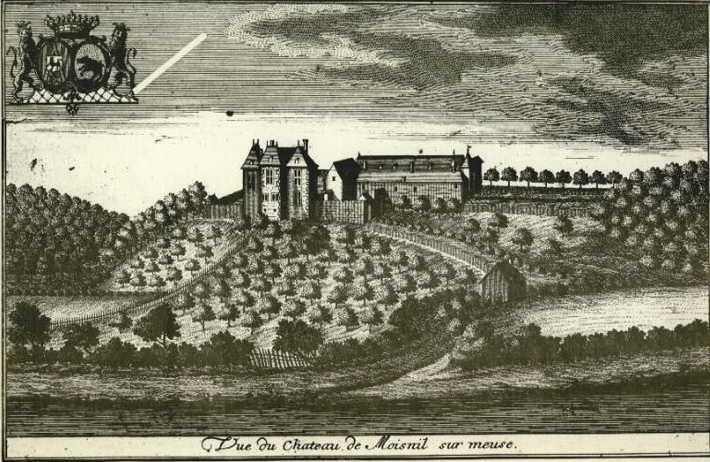
Old engraving of the Château that reads View of the Château du Moisnil on the Meuse (circa 1753–1794)

=== Ancien Régime ===
The whole fief counted about 100 ha for Maizeret and about 160 ha for Moinil. The Moinil lot consisted in 1314, of a "tower" and a house, which would become the nucleus of the future castle.

The "sub-fief" of Moinil frequently changed owners: in 1645 the seigniory and its castle are sold for 22,000 guilders, to be sold again in 1677 for 2,440 guilders, the castle and the buildings being in ruins.

The fief became the property of Vincent de la Boverie, mayeur of the ferrons and master of the forges who rebuilt it and transformed it into a real "pleasure home".

The de Baré family obtained the lands of Maizeret and Moisnil in 1753. The last lord of Maizeret in the Ancien Régime was Baron Jacques de Baré de Moisnil, lord of Houchenée.

=== 20th century ===
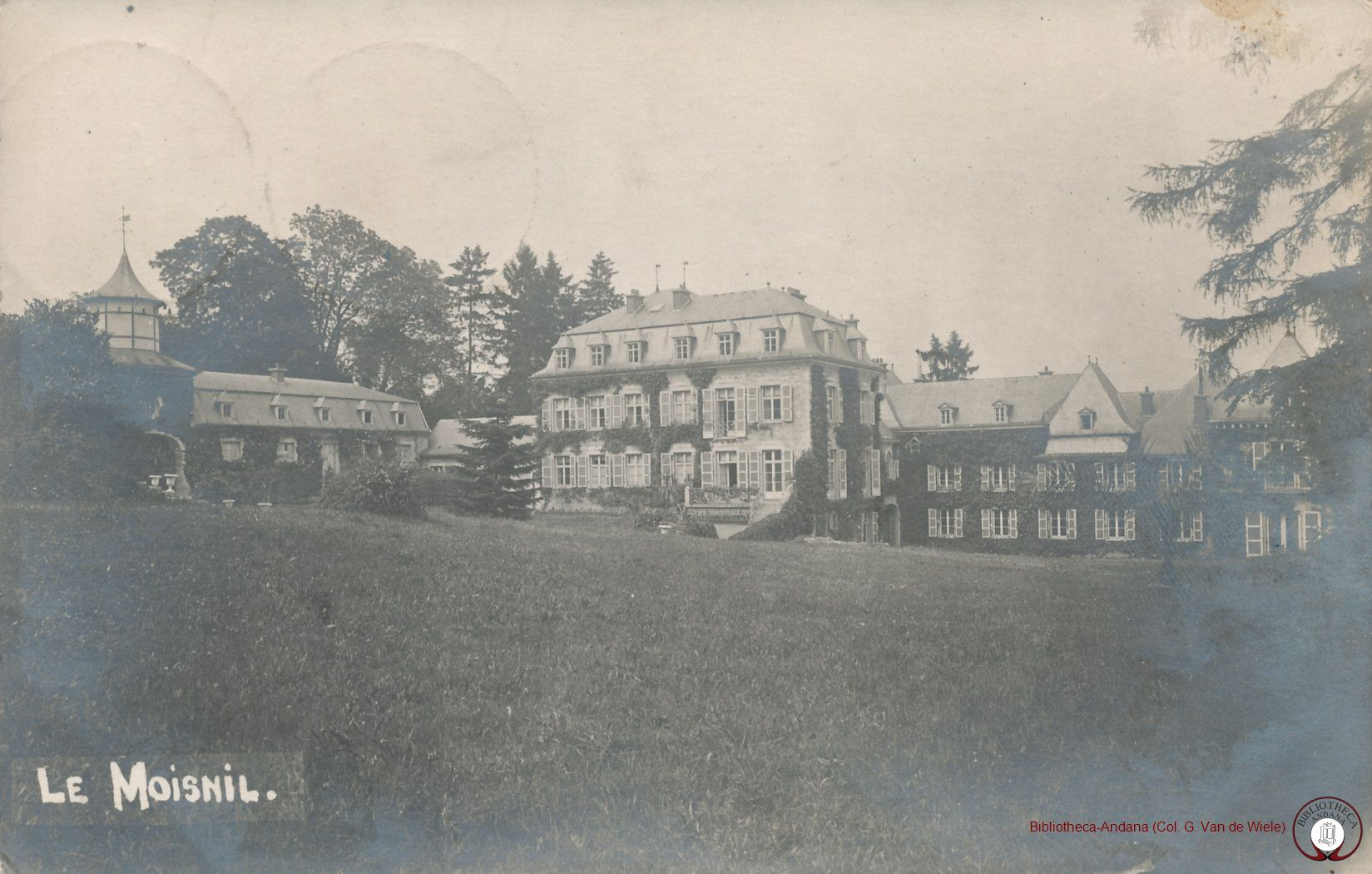
The Château in 1924

In 1902, the extensions made by Jules van Dievoet after the plans of architect Octave Flanneau were made.

In June 1922, the « Les Journaux Réunis de Lille à Roubaix » company bought the château including its grounds of 35 hectares from Marguerite Anspach, widow of Jules van Dievoet. As a result of this purchase, Mrs Duhamel, owner of this press company, occupied the property for nearly 17 years.

Later, Marguerite de la Barre d'Erquelinnes, wife of Count Antoine d'Ursel, a resistance and Comet Line leader in World War II, acquired the land of Moisnil on 21 March 1939. The family built a new porch in 1960. It was also around this time that the operations of the adjoining farm ceased. Since 1988, the Château has been inhabited by their son, Count Didier d'Ursel.

=== WWII ===
Shortly before the war, the castle was requisitioned to house the garrison of Fort Maizeret. Beginning from the general mobilization of September 1938, it served as cantonment to the soldiers in charge of the defense of the valley of the Meuse.

On 12 May 1940 the castle was bombed by surprise by the Luftwaffe, at the same time as the city of Namur. The oldest parts of the old Château were destroyed, and today only the cellars remain, hidden under a layer of gravel.

=== Anecdote ===
It is said that the old château had been inhabited in the 17th century by Henri de La Fontaine who happened to be related to Jean de La Fontaine, the famous fabulist. It is said that Jean de La Fontaine, who followed Louis XIV as a historiographer during the siege of Namur, stayed there in 1692 with this distant cousin and composed "Les Animaux malades de la peste" there. The stone bench from which he could admire the beauty of the Mosan landscape is still there.

== Dendrology ==
There was in 1912, at the time of Jules van Dievoet, a very nice specimen of Tsuga mertensiana in the grounds of the chateau.

== Armorial ==
Arms of the last lord of Maizeret in the Ancien Régime, Baron Jacques de Baré de Moisnil, lord of Houchenée

Arms of Jules van Dievoet, owner of the Chateau of which he built the only remaining part in 1902

Arms of Marguerite Anspach, owner after the death of her husband Jules van Dievoet

Arms of Marguerite de La Barre d’Erquelinnes, wife of Count Antoine d'Ursel, who acquired the land of Moisnil on 21 March 1939

Arms of the Ursel family, current owners

== Bibliography ==
- Paul De Zuttere, "Contribution à l'œuvre des peintres Antoine et Ignace Brice (XVIIIe et XIXe siècles) et généalogie succincte de la famille alliée Flanneau", in l'Intermédiaire des Généalogistes, Brussels, 2003, n° 345, p. 113 à 133.
- Jean Chalon, "Les arbres remarquables de la Belgique", dans Bulletin de la Société royale de Botanique, Volume 49, 1912, p. 166, tells us that: « on the grounds of M. Jules van Dievoet (château du Moisnil, v. n°s 727 à 731), there is a nice Tsuga Mertensiana specimen. 1211. Maizeret, Tsuga. »

== See also ==
- Jules van Dievoet
- Van Dievoet family
- Ursel Family
- Anspach family
