= Scladina =

Caves and archaeological site in Belgium

- Grotte de Scladina (French)
- Sclayn Cave
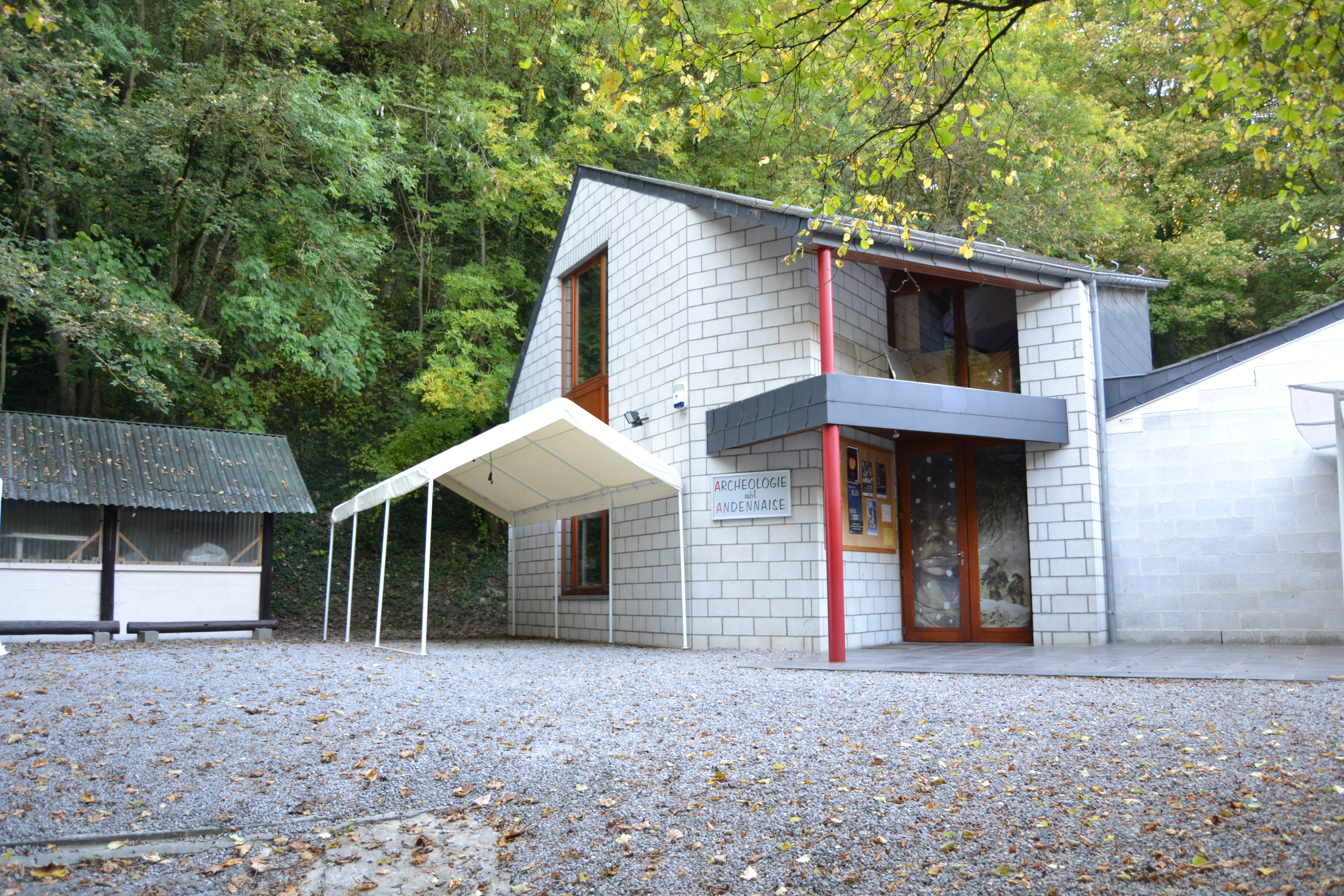
- Scladina Center

- Location in Belgium Scladina (Europe)
- 50°29′2″N 5°1′32″E
- Periods: Palaeolithic
- Associated with: Neanderthals
- Location: near the village of Sclayn, Province of Namur
- Region: Andenne, Belgium

Site notes
- Material: limestone
- Excavation dates: since 1971
- Archaeologists: of ASBL Archéologie Andennaise

Scladina, or Sclayn Cave, is an archaeological site located in Wallonia in the town of Sclayn, in the Andenne hills in Belgium, where excavations since 1978 have provided the material for an exhaustive collection of over thirteen thousand Mousterian stone artifacts and the fossilized remains of an especially ancient Neanderthal, called the Scladina child were discovered in 1993.

== Scladina cave site ==
The Scladina cave is located on a hill to the right of the Meuse river bank, south-west of Sclayn village, being one of a number of caves in the middle Meuse river region, where significant paleontological discoveries were made as in the Spy Cave and the Lyell Cave. The caves in the area have undergone systematic exploration since 1949.

Scladina Cave was discovered in 1971 by cavers of the CAS (Archaeological Circle Sclaynois). In 1978, the Scientific Council of the Prehistory Department of the University of Liège began to direct the excavations. Since the site has yielded numerous artifacts of Mousterian Neanderthal origin, amidst assemblages of stone tools, bones and faunal remains. After the initial clearing of the entrance, the excavations uncovered two strata of Neanderthal occupation, the oldest dating back 130,000 years. The sediments yielded artifacts and Mousterian stone tools, the earliest were attributed to the Middle Palaeolithic. The lithic industry of layer 5 is considered to be instrumental for a deeper understanding of the Mousterian settlements in the region. Future studies might support the acquisition of a more accurate chronology and help to draw a more complete image of the contemporary environment of the site.

The excellent state of preservation of the fossils faunal remains and the sediments have allowed the site to become a point of reference in climatic evolution studies of Palaeolithic north-western Europe. Two Neanderthal occupation sites were identified, one dated to be 130,000 years old and the other 40,000 years. Modern humans infrequently occupied the site between 32,000 and 9,000 years ago and used the site as a burial place during the late Neolithic and Bronze Age between 5,300 and 2,000 years ago. Continued excavations since 1978 have produced a steady stream of findings that culminated in the discovery of the remarkable Sclayn child fossils in 1993. Sclayn cave site has been classified as a national heritage site of Wallonia on 27 May 2009 and is since open to the public.

== Scladina Neanderthal child ==
Dated to be around 127,000 years old, the first fragment of the now nearly complete mandible was found on 16 July 1993. A maxillary fragment and several teeth of the child were excavated in subsequent campaigns. A genetic sample was successfully extracted from one of the molars at a specific laboratory for ancient DNA and analyzed at the Max Planck Institute for Evolutionary Anthropology, Leipzig.

== Physiology and development ==
The child's DNA is one of the oldest to have been extracted from a Homo neanderthalensis fossil and has significantly contributed to the genetic mapping of the Neanderthal genome and the comparison with Homo sapiens. Initially it was suggested that the Scladina child was 2 to 4 years older than current estimates, based upon traditional assessments of the progressive dental development. Results of an international research collaboration allow the proposal that Homo neanderthalensis children had a faster rate of dental development than modern human children as well as other aspects of physical development were likely to be more rapid in juvenile Neanderthals, such as a quicker onset of sexual maturity and different and faster patterns of early cognitive development.

The study further elaborates that tooth development is related to overall physiological development, noticeable as the first molar eruption coincides – universally across the primate phylum – with the beginning of the weaning stage. In contrast, the upsurge of the third molar indicates the onset of sexual development. Some scholars debate universal periods of anterior tooth growth, as it is known that anterior tooth growth takes longer in great apes than in humans and varies among human populations. The study of the child turned out to support the idea that significantly prolonged duration of human development is unique to Homo sapiens and a relatively recent development in human evolution. Although the matter is still debated, the more rapid development apparent in Homo neanderthalensis children (wherein sexual onset may have occurred up to 4 years sooner) puts Neanderthal development patterns at a progressive stage in between modern Homo sapiens and that of earlier species, such as Homo erectus. This trend suggests to many scientists the necessary prevalence of differing patterns of behavioral and social development as well.

A single tooth of another Neanderthal infant, also found at the site, was analysed by Christine Austin and Tanya Smith, whose analysis suggests that this particular child has received 7 months of breastfeeding and supplementation for additional 7 months, which adds up to roughly 14 months of breastfeeding. This cycle is indeed longer than that of some contemporary human cultures, which implies that Neanderthal children might have grown up faster, a process that began only after the stages of early infancy.

== Behavior and tool use ==
Neanderthal diet consisted to over 70% of meat, unlike that of contemporary Homo sapiens hunter-gatherer societies. although some cooked vegetables are evident. Provisioning techniques, made superior by extensive tool use, aided early Homo in pursuits of worldwide expansion. One large game evident in the diets of Scladina Neanderthals is bear. Several bear bones were found amongst other stone tools and modifiers within the Scladina cave site. Wear marks on the bones, 4 of the 6 bear bone tools which originated from a single femur, exhibit abrasion traits that classify them as lithic retouchers.

== Neanderthal bone tool from a cave lion (Panthera spelaea) ==
Thanks to scientific advances in biochemistry and molecular biology since their discovery nearly 43 years ago, the prehistoric bone tools excavated in 1982 at the Scladina Cave have been characterised by Abrams et al. (2025). Proteomic analysis of the bones, the results of which were published in the journal Scientific Reports (Nature journal), reveals that the bones studied are those of a cave lion (Panthera spelaea). These multi-functional tools were made by Neanderthals during the Middle Paleolithic, about 130,000 years ago, during the warm Eemian period. This was the Last Interglacial period, which began at the end of the Penultimate Glacial Period of the Quaternary and ended about 115,000 years ago at the beginning of the Last Glacial Period. The Eemian corresponds to the interglacial period between the Riss and the Würm glaciation in the Alps. The proteins analysed are believed to originate from the flesh of an animal killed or that died shortly before being butchered, rather than from decomposing carcass remains affected by putrefaction. Such a discovery suggests that Neanderthal hunters faced high risks and probably also implies great daring in confronting this formidable beast, the greatest predator of humans at that time. This discovery is the first of its kind in the world.

== Public education ==
The ASBL Archéologie Andennaise has undertaken an educational mission as a result of the extensive, detailed, and insightful study of the site and the significant implications of the acquired information and data. The aim is to accurately inform the public about prehistory, which still appears nebulous and mythical to many. The site and its documentation centre are accessible to the public throughout the year. Private groups and school classes are permanently granted access to the cave, the laboratory, the museum gallery with multimedia programme rooms, accompanied by researchers and scientists themselves.

== See also ==
- List of human evolution fossils
- Timeline of glaciation
- Last Interglacial
- Milankovitch cycles
