= Andenne =

City in Wallonia, Belgium

Andenne: Andene (Walloon)
- Municipality
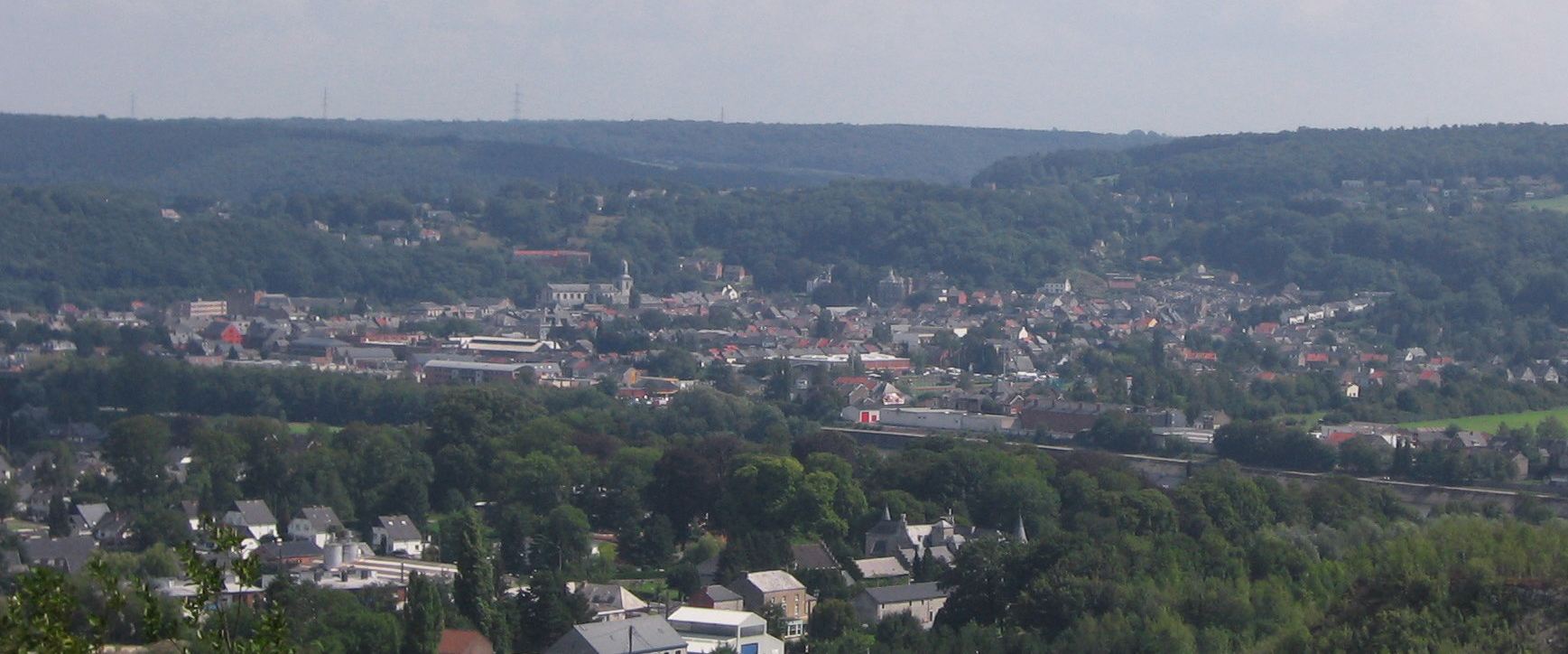

- Flag Coat of arms

- Location of Andenne in Namur Province
- Interactive map of Andenne
- Location in Belgium
- Coordinates: 50°29′N 05°06′E
- Country: Belgium
- Community: French Community
- Region: Wallonia
- Province: Namur
- Arrondissement: Namur

Government
  - Mayor: Vincent Sampaoli (PS, PSD@)
  - Governing party: PSD@

Area
  - Total: 86.11 km^{2} (33.25 sq mi)

Population (2020-01-01)
  - Total: 27,573
  - Density: 320.2/km^{2} (829.3/sq mi)
- Postal codes: 5300
- NIS code: 92003
- Area codes: 085 and 081
- Website: www.andenne.be

Andenne (French pronunciation: [ɑ̃.dɛn]; Walloon: Andene) is a city and municipality of Wallonia located in the province of Namur, Belgium.

On January 1, 2006, Andenne had a total population of 25,240. The total area is 86.17 km^{2} which gives a population density of 292 inhabitants per km^{2}. The municipality, and the central city, extend on both sides of the river Meuse.

The municipality consists of the following districts: Andenne, Bonneville, Coutisse, Landenne, Maizeret, Namêche, Sclayn, Seilles, Thon-Samson, and Vezin.

== History ==
Evidence of ancient Neanderthal occupation was discovered at the Scladina cave site in the village of Sclayn. The region of Adenne was already settled in Roman times, but the town's significant growth began around 692 with the foundation of the monastery by Saint Begga, the daughter of Pepin of Landen. Following a trip to Rome, the Pope encouraged her to establish a sanctuary. According to local legend, God indicated the exact location of the monetary to Begga using a sow with seven piglets and with seven chicks. This signified that the abbey should have seven chapels, giving rise to the name Andanna ad septem ecclias (adenne with the seven churches). However, the origin of these seven parishes was more likely inspired by the traditional pilgrimage to the seven basilicas of Rome.

The original seven churches were destroyed in the 18^{th} century. Between 1764 and 1778 their stones were reused to build the neoclassical Collegiate Church of Saint Begga, designed by Laurent-Benoît Dewez.

Saint Begga's grandson, The Frankish ruler Charles Martel was traditionally said to be a native of Andenne. The city is symbolized by a bear, which originates from a local legend stating that a young Charles Martel killed a bear that was terrorizing the region with his bare hands.

Because Andenne was strategically located near the border of County of Namur and the Principality of Liege, the town suffered frequent attacks and destruction. It was looted and burned by Norseman in 883. Suffered repeated burnings and plundering by forces from Namur and Liège between the 11^{th} and 15^{th} centuries. Andenne was involved in the 13th-century Cow's War.

Despite these conflicts, Adenne developed a strong industrial reputation. In the Middle Ages, the town was known across Europe for its pottery and terracotta tiles, which were produced using a local highly plastic white clay known as blanche derle. By the late 18^{th} century, the town expanded into clay pipe production and refined earthenware, eventually producing porcelain of international repute in the 19^{th} century.

Adenne was the location of the Château du Moisnil. Andenne was also associated with the Rape of Belgium during World War I. On August 19, 1914, German troops entered the area, and on August 20, they began a massacre that killed 225 men, woman and children. Claiming they had been attacked.

== Notable individuals ==
- Saint Begga (613–693), daughter of Pepin of Landen and mother of Pepin of Herstal. She founded a convent in Andenne of which she was the first abbess. She is buried in the Collegiate Church of Saint Begga in Andenne.
- Gertrude of Nivelles, (ca.628–659), abbess, who, with her mother Itta, founded the Nivelles Abbey; younger sister of St. Begga.
- Carl Johan Frederik Jakhelln (1914–1987), Norwegian diplomat and writer
- Fats Sadi (1927–2009, Huy), jazz musician
- Roger Laboureur (1935–2025), sports journalist
- Cécile de France (born 1975), actress

== Gallery ==
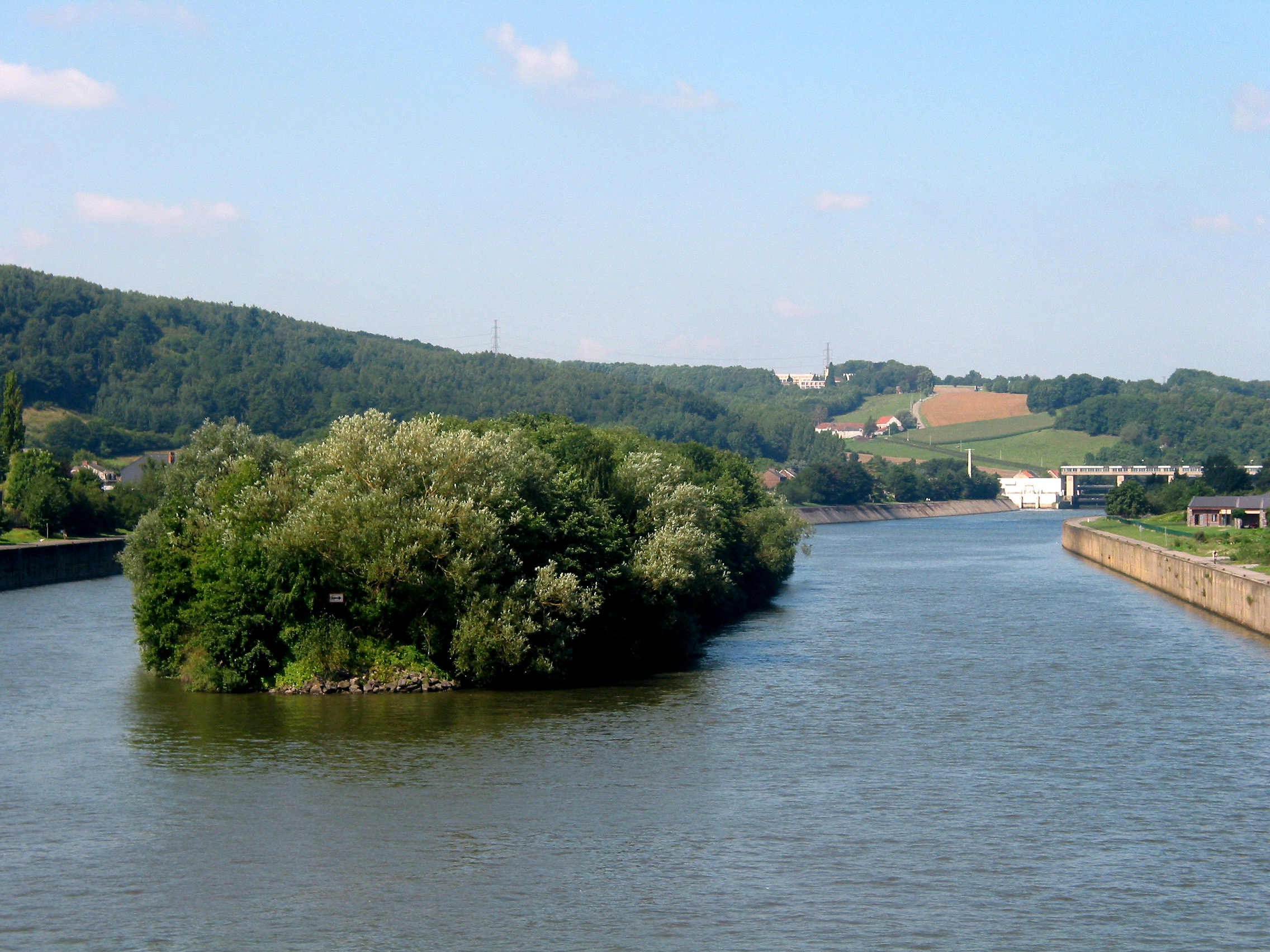
The Meuse River

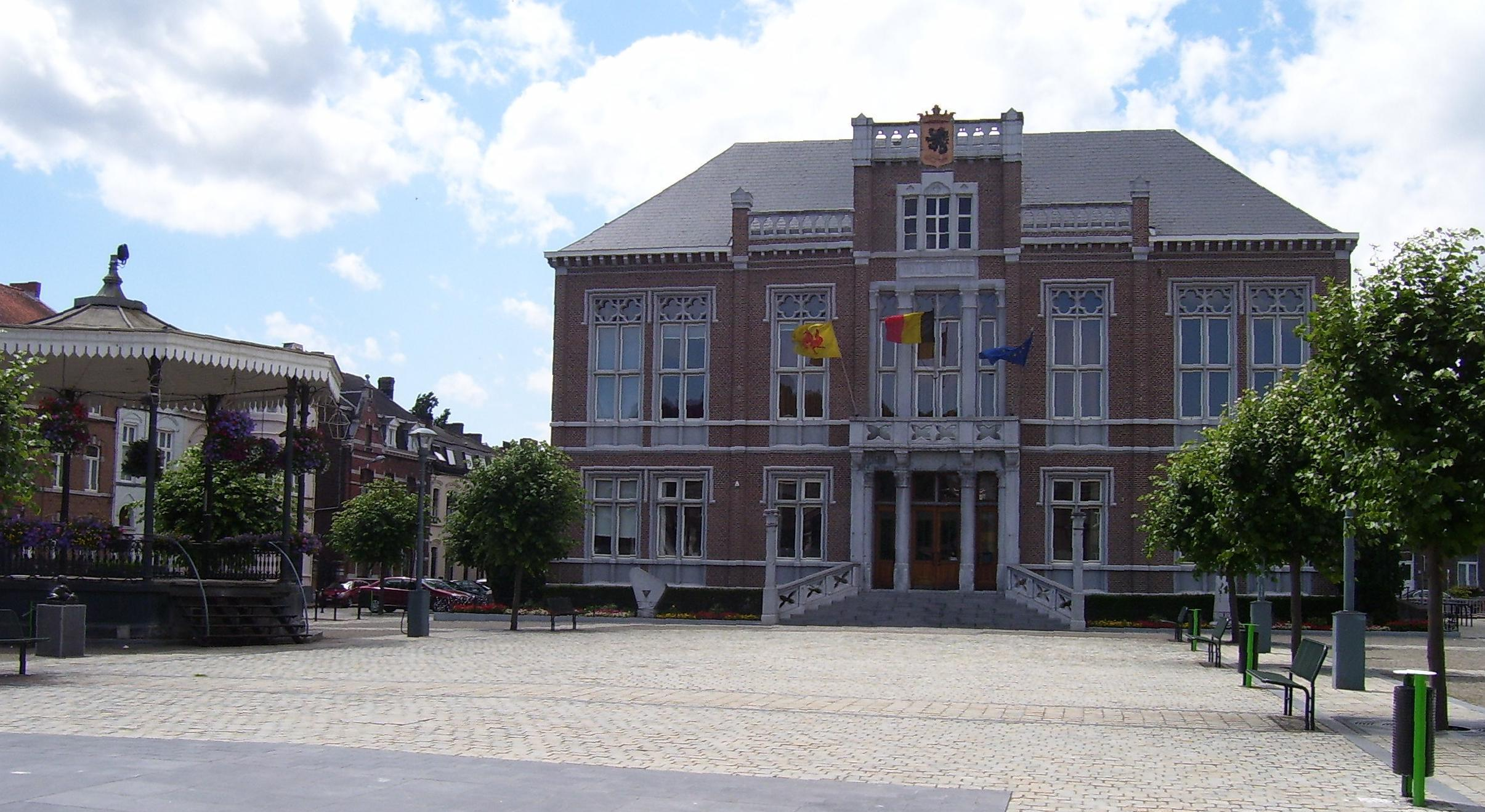
The City Hall

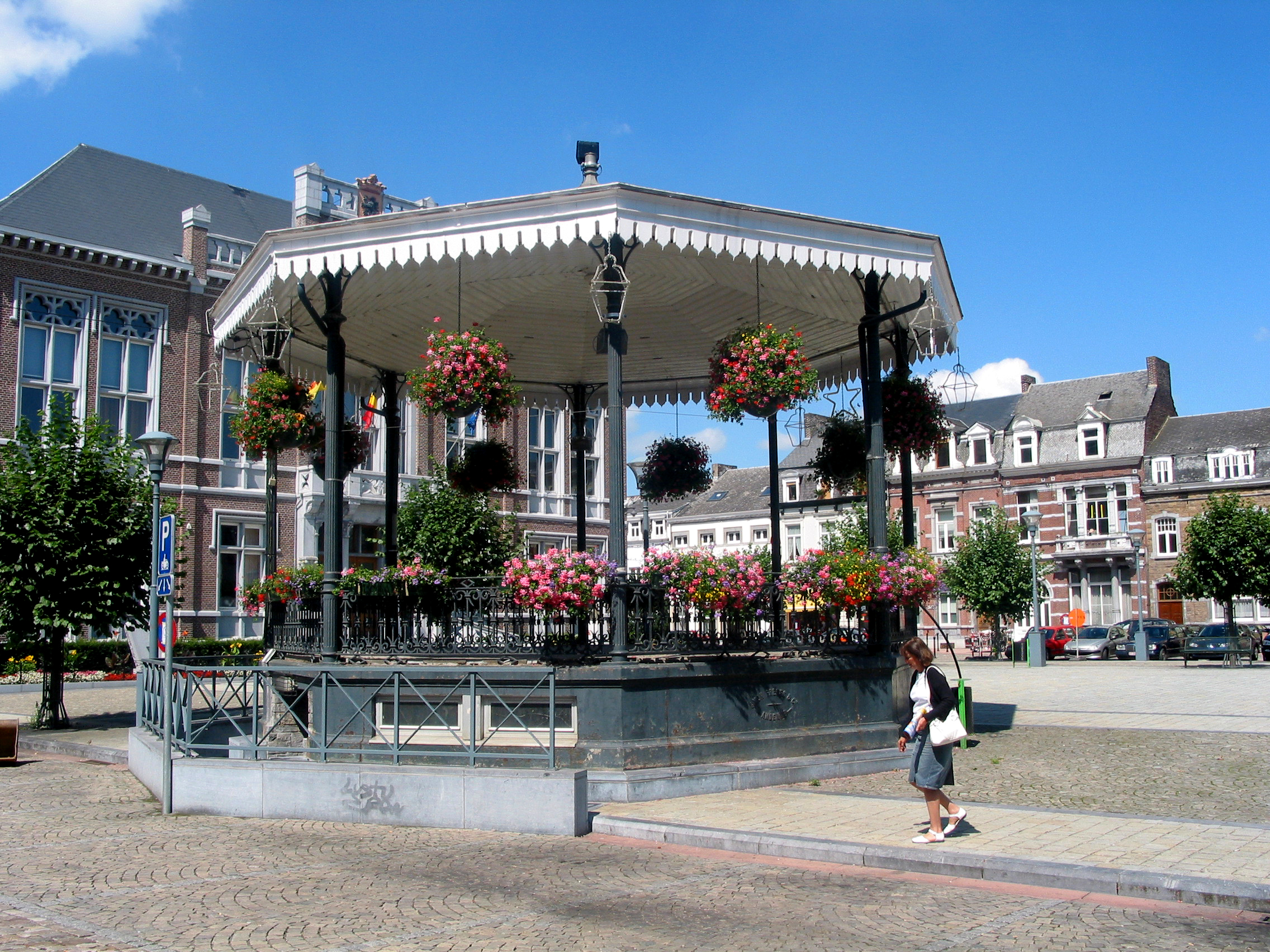
Place des Tilleuls – The kiosk (1879)

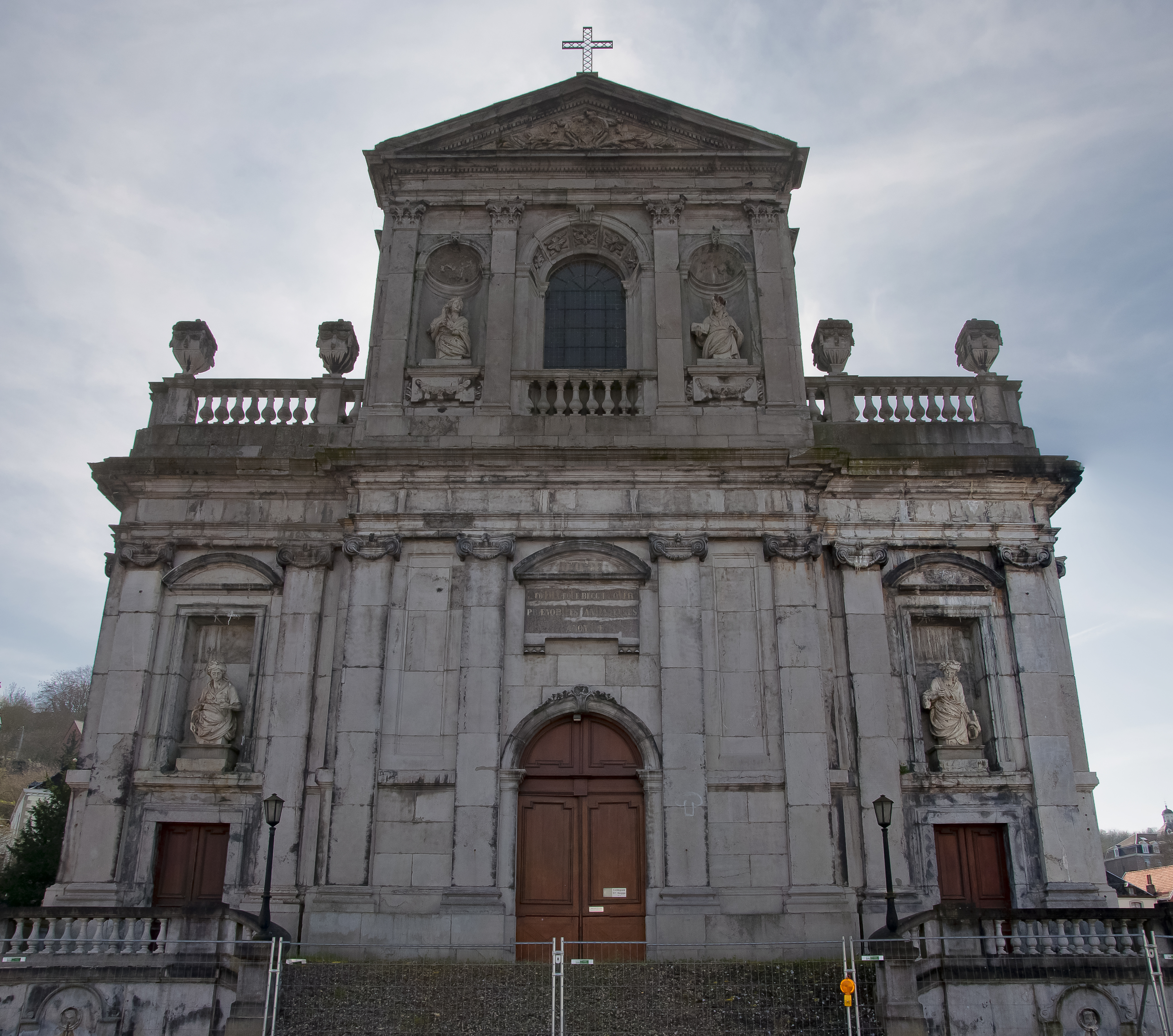
Collegiate Church of Saint Begga

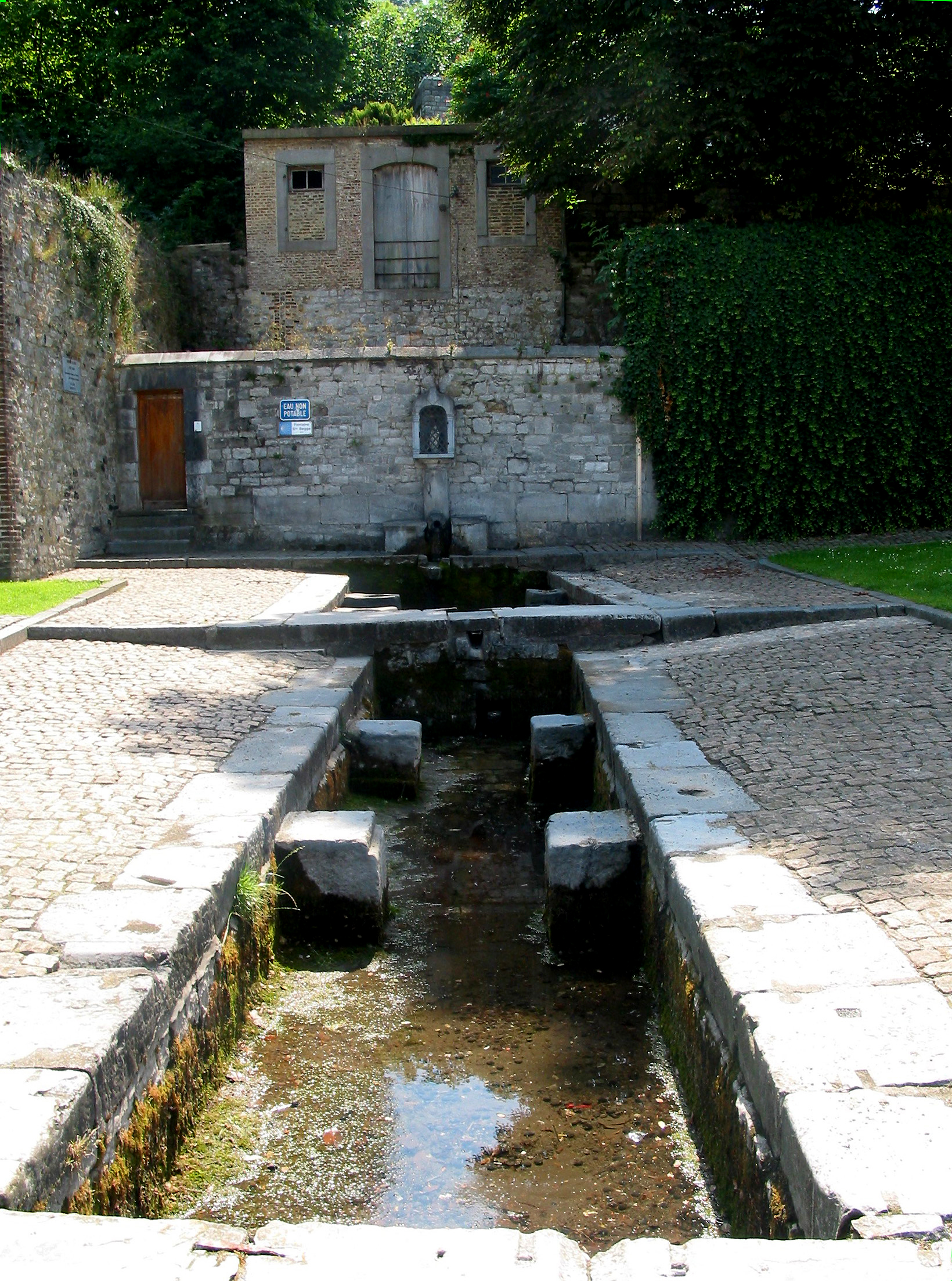
The St. Begge fountain

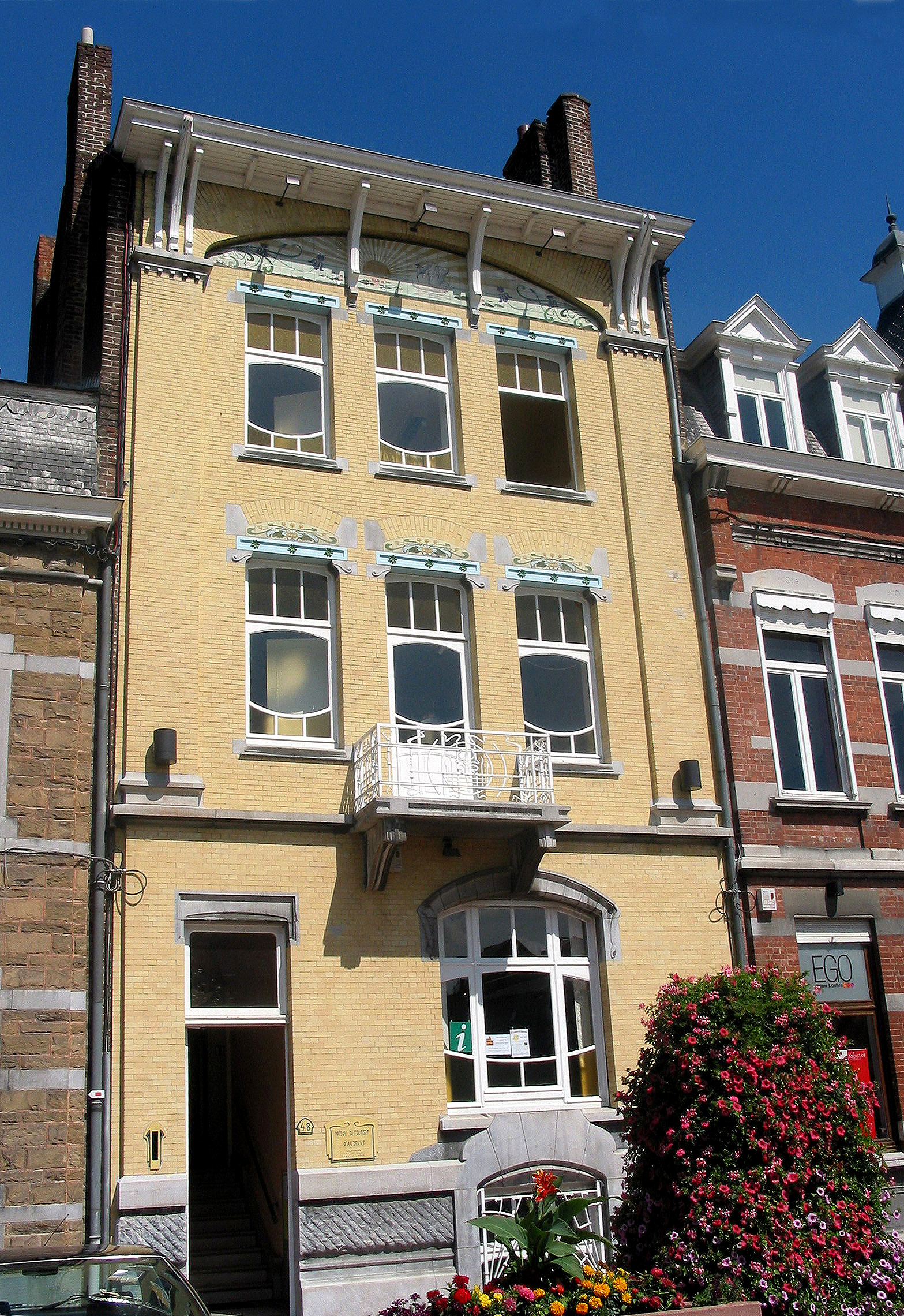
Office du Tourisme – "Art Nouveau" house (1907)

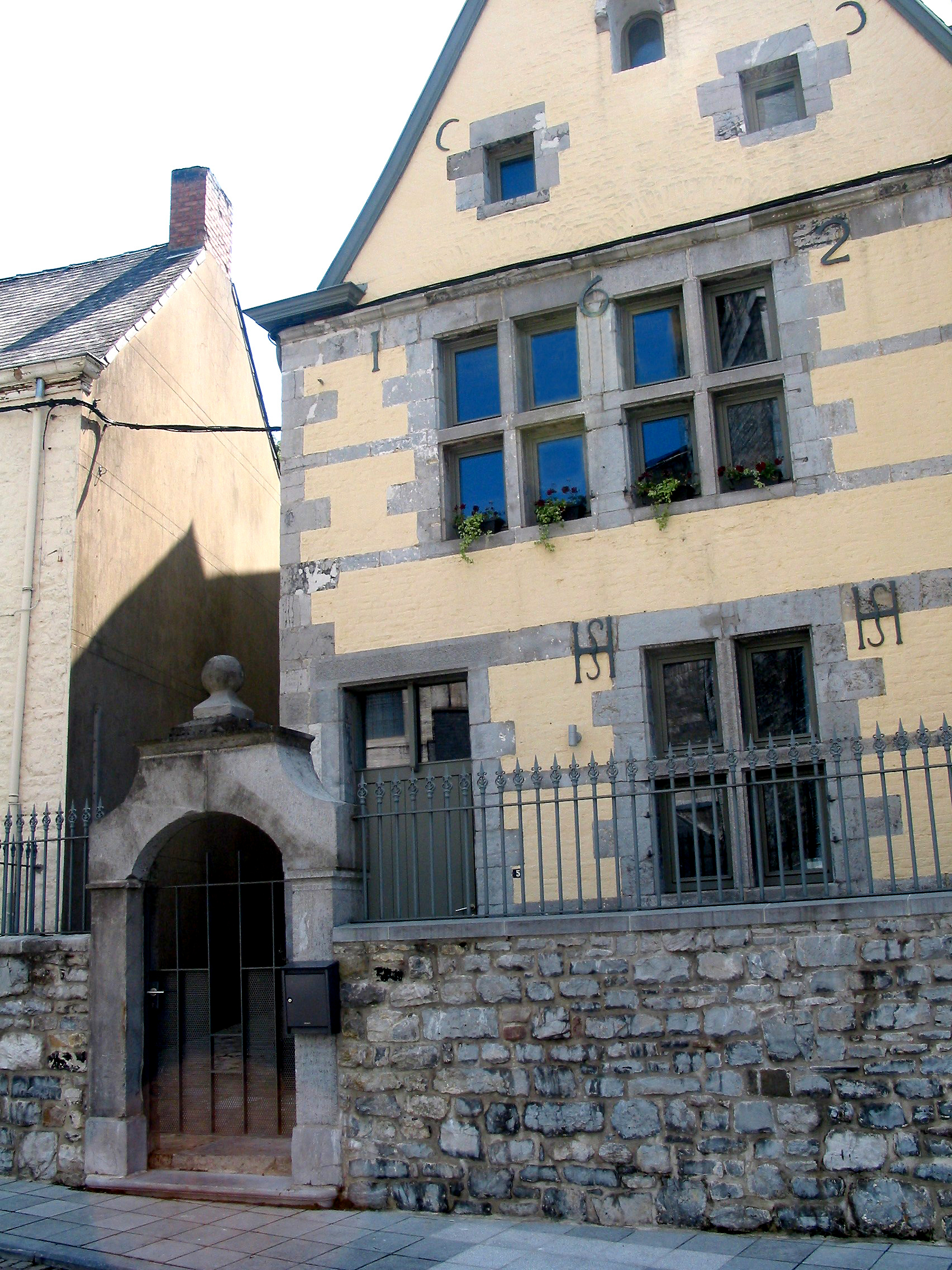
St. Begge house (1623)

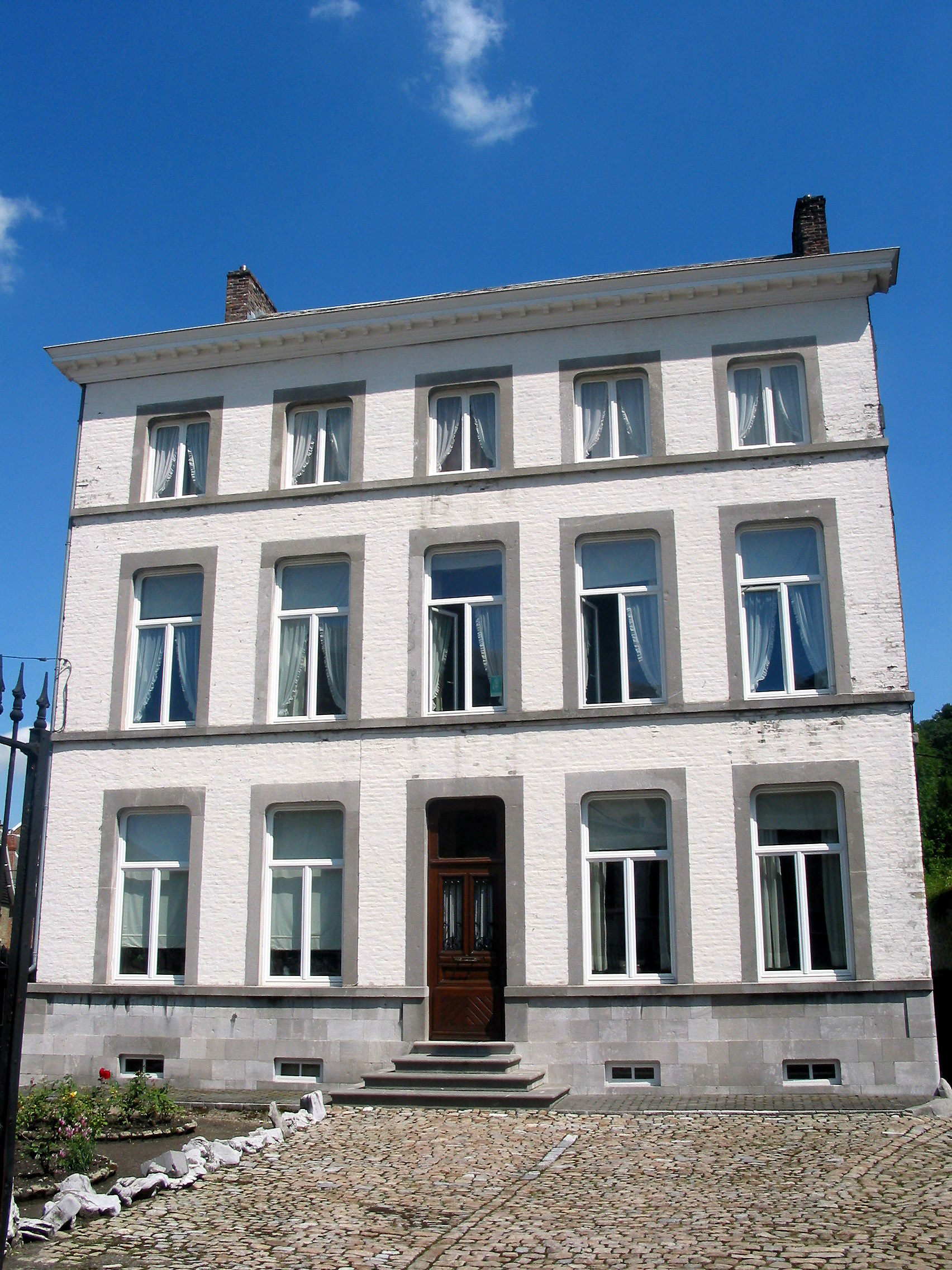
Classical house called "Maison de Chanoinesses"

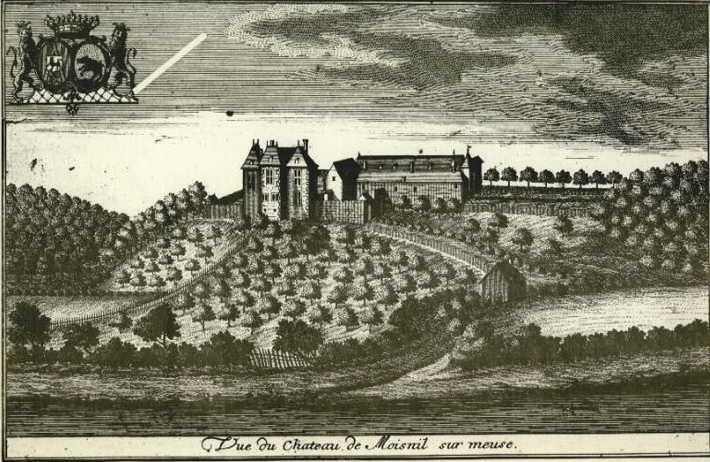
Old engraving of the Château du Moisnil in Andenne

== See also ==
- List of protected heritage sites in Andenne
- Maizeret
- Château du Moisnil
