= Anspach family =

- Country: Republic of Geneva Austrian Netherlands; French First Republic; First French Empire; United Kingdom of the Netherlands; Switzerland Kingdom of Belgium
- Place of origin: Schwabenheim an der Selz
- Founded: 17th century
- Titles: List: Baron; Burgomaster of Schwabenheim an der Selz; Attorney General of the Republic of Geneva; Burgomaster of Brussels; Plenipotentiary Minister of Belgium; Governor of the National Bank of Belgium; Pastor
- Estate: Château du Moisnil in Maizeret

The Anspach family is a Belgian noble family, established in Brussels at the beginning of the 19th century. It comes from the Republic of Geneva, from which they acquired the bourgeoisie in 1779. Before that, they originated from Schwabenheim (Swabia, Baden-Württemberg).

== Members ==
- Johann Wilhelm Anspach (c.1640-c. 1726), burgomaster of Schwabenheim an der Selz.
- Isaac Salomon Anspach, Protestant pastor.
- Dorothée (Dorine) Anspach, reader and governess of Duchess Louise Charlotte of Mecklenburg-Schwerin, born in Geneva on 23 July 1777 and died in Gotha in 1835, married Baron Édouard von Seebach, chamberlain of Prince of Altenburg, born in 1749 and died in Gotha in 1850 at the age of 101. Dorothée (Dorine) Anspach was ennobled by the Prince of Altenburg on 22 June 1814. She translated several books from German into French.
- François Anspach, (1784–1858), banker and politician.
- Baron Jules Anspach, burgomaster of the city of Brussels.
- Edouard Anspach (1831–1902), Plenipotentiary Minister of Belgium to Rio, Stockholm, Lisbon and Madrid.
- Eugène Anspach, Belgian politician and financier.
- Paul Anspach, Belgian fencer.
- Louis Anspach Swiss miniaturist painter.

== See also ==
- Bourgeoisie of Geneva
- Belgian nobility
- Jules Van Dievoet
- Anspach (surname)

== Bibliography ==
- Madame Dolez, "Les Anspach d'Est en Ouest", in : Le Parchemin, n° 240, 1985, p. 375. (Published by the Genealogical and Heraldic Office of Belgium)
