= Jules Van Dievoet =

Jules van Dievoet K. O. Leopold
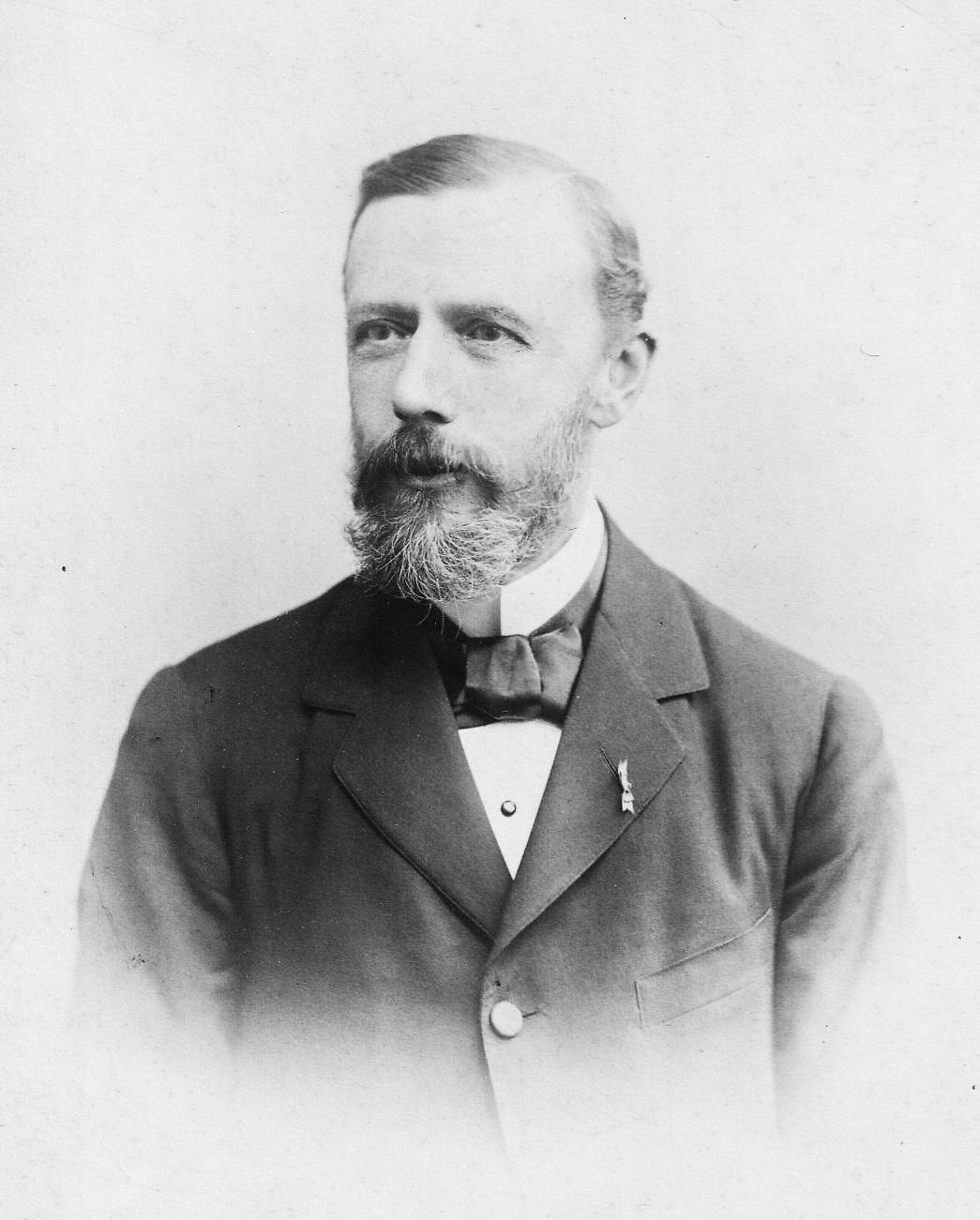
- Born: 7 March 1844; Brussels
- Died: 2 March 1917 (aged 72); Brussels
- Resting place: Brussels Cemetery
- Education: Université libre de Bruxelles
- Occupations: Lawyer, jurist
- Family: Van Dievoet family

Jules Van Dievoet (/ˈdiːvʊt/, 7 March 1844 – 2 March 1917) was a Belgian jurist and Supreme Court advocate.

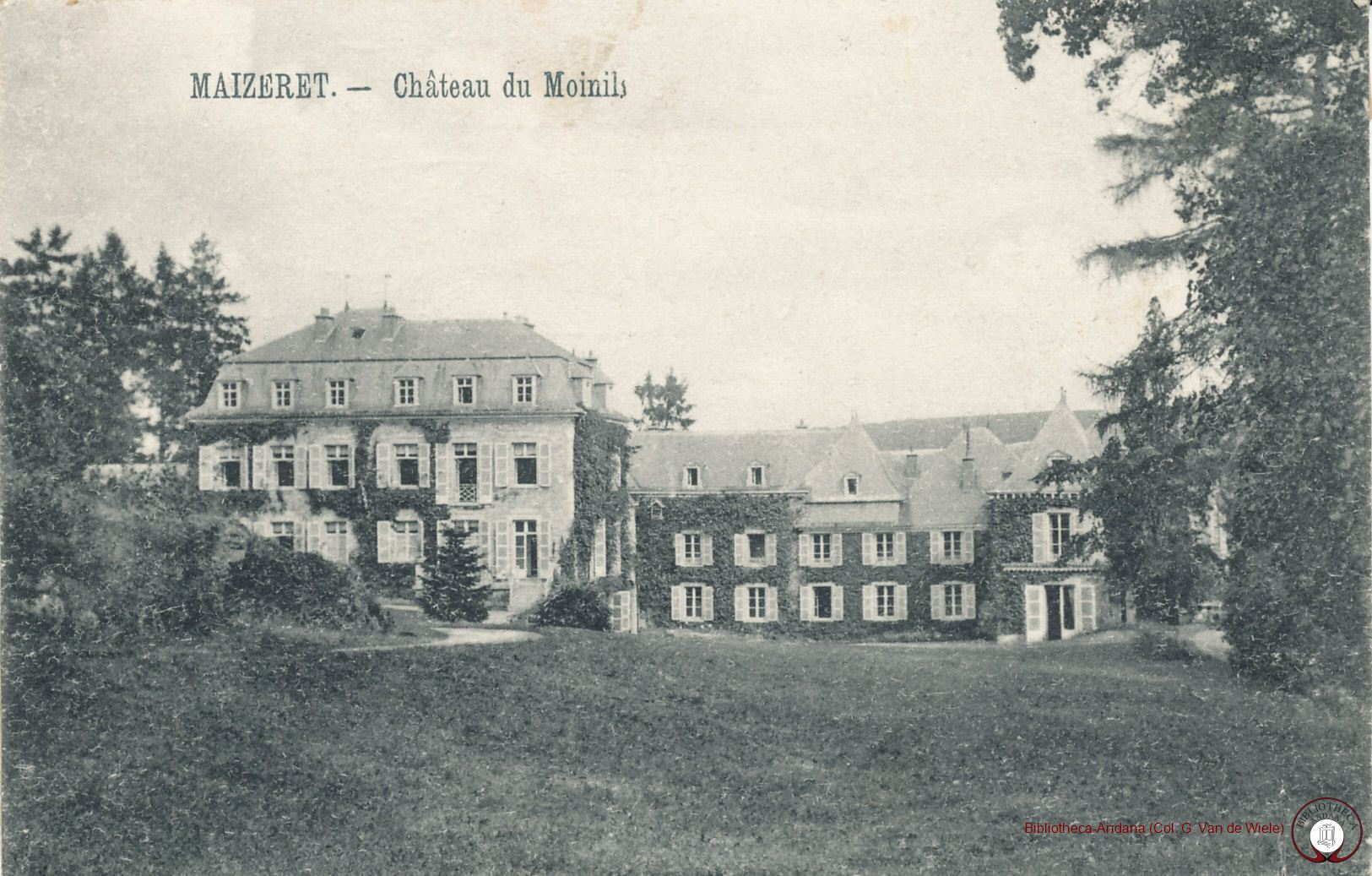
Jules van Dievoet was the owner of the Château du Moisnil

He was the son of Augustus Van Dievoet, jurist, lawyer, historian and Latin writer.

== Biography ==
He married Marguerite Anspach (18 September 1852 – 24 December 1934), daughter of Jules Anspach, burgomaster of the City of Brussels.

After studying at the Athénée de Bruxelles and studying at the Faculty of Law of the Free University of Brussels, where he obtained his doctorate in law with distinction in 1865, he was destined for the career of a lawyer.

After an internship at Louis Leclercq, he was sworn in as a lawyer on 18 August 1865. He was appointed barrister at the Court of Cassation by Royal Decree of 31 December 1880, replacing Auguste Orts, who had died.

He was president of the Bar of Cassation from 1900 to 1902.

He was a member of the circle of influence known as La Table Ronde lit. 'The Round Table' which consisted of 20 personalities who "seem to have been men of confidence of Leopold II".

== Honours ==
- Knight of the Order of Leopold

== See also ==
- Van Dievoet family

== Bibliography ==
- Bart Coppein and Jérôme De Brouwer, Histoire du barreau de Bruxelles / 1811–2011 / Geschiedenis van de balie van Brussel, Brussels, Bruylant, 2012, p. 88.
- Jean Chalon, "Les arbres remarquables de la Belgique", dans Bulletin de la Société royale de Botanique, tome 49, 1912, p. 166
- Discours prononcés à l'audience du 29 mars 1917 par le Premier Président du Pont, le Procureur général Terlinden et le bâtonnier Picard.
- Michel Dumoulin, Les relations économiques italo-belges (1861-1914), Bruxelles, Palais des Académies, 2004, pp. 196 et 370.
- Paul Hymans, Mémoires, publiés par Frans van Kalken avec la collaboration de John Bartier, Bruxelles, Éditions de l'Institut de Sociologie Solvay, 1958, volume II, pp. 838–839 et p. 1062.
- Catherine Leclercq, Jacques de Lalaing. Artiste et homme du monde (1858-1917). Avec de larges extraits de son journal, Bruxelles, Académie royale de Belgique, 2006, p. 117.
- Léon Vanderkindere, L'Université de Bruxelles, notice historique, Bruxelles, 1884, annexe p. CXXXVI.
- Alain Van Dievoet, « Généalogie de la famille van Dievoet originaire de Bruxelles, dite van Dive à Paris », in Le Parchemin, éd. Office généalogique et héraldique de Belgique, Bruxelles, 1986, n° 245, p. 273 à 293.
- Georges van Hecke, Notes pour servir à l'histoire du barreau de cassation, Bruxelles, 1979, pp. 20, 38, 58.
