= Landenne =

Landenne Landene (Walloon)
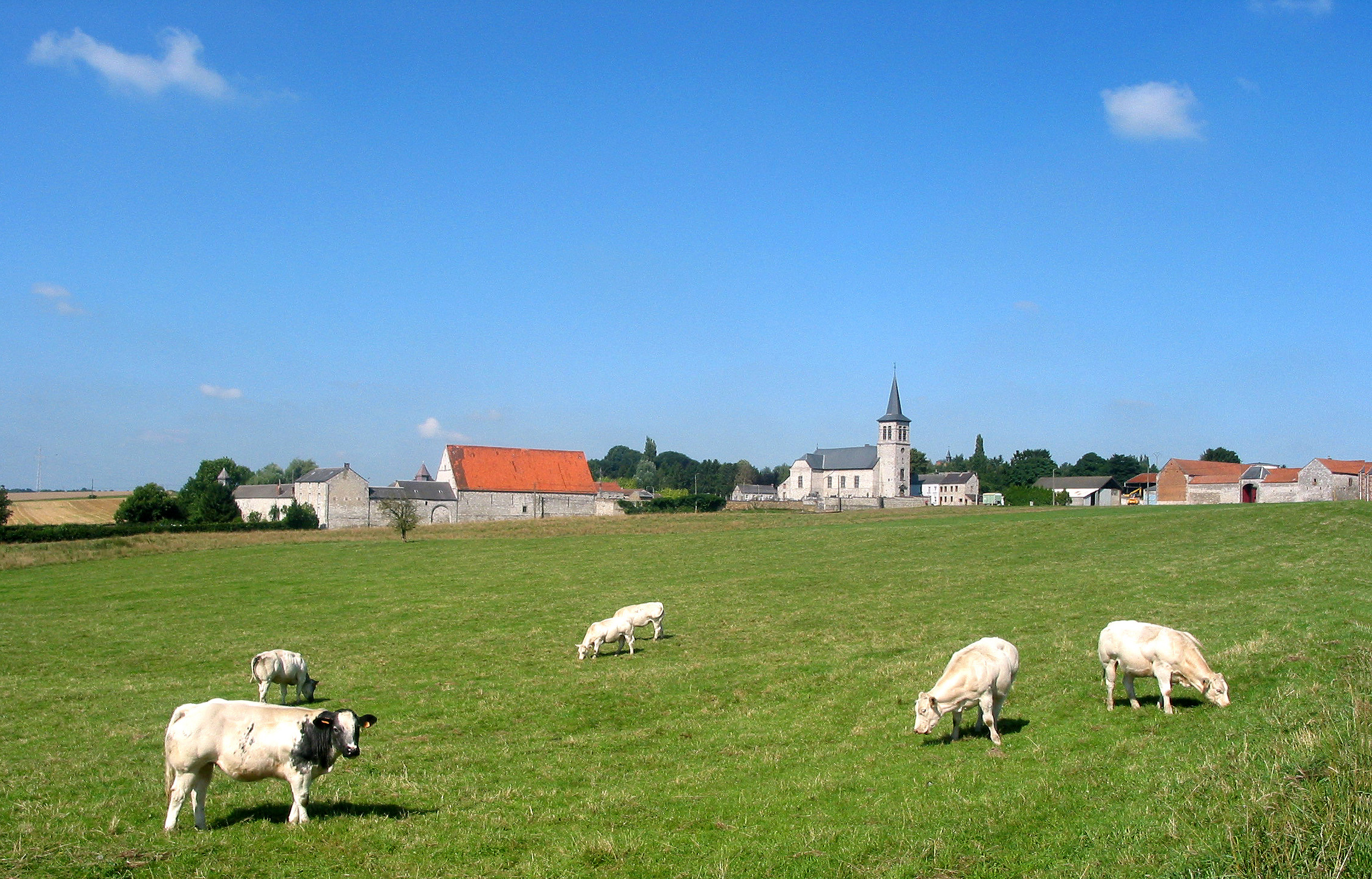
- Landenne

- Location within Belgium Location within Europe
- Coordinates: 50°30′50″N 05°03′54″E
- Country: Belgium
- Region: Wallonia
- Province: Namur
- Municipality: Andenne

Landenne (French pronunciation: [lɑ̃dɛn]; Walloon: Landene) is a village of Wallonia and a district of the municipality of Andenne, located in the province of Namur, Belgium.

The village contains a church from the 18th century and a fortified farm from the 16th century.
