= List of protected heritage sites in Andenne =

This table shows an overview of the protected heritage sites in the Walloon town Andenne. This list is part of Belgium's national heritage.

Object	Year/architect	Town/section	Address	Coordinates	Number^{?}	Image
College of St. Begge ^{(nl)} ^{(fr)}		Andenne		50.486864°N 5.100867°E	92003-CLT-0001-01 Info	Collegiale Sainte-Begge More images
Place du Chapitre ^{(nl)} ^{(fr)}		Andenne		50.487431°N 5.100040°E	92003-CLT-0002-01 Info	Site van la place du Chapitre, waaronder de collegiale, de fontein Sainte-Begge, de vierkanten, gazons en mediaan
Place des Tilleuls ^{(nl)} ^{(fr)}		Andenne		50.489522°N 5.095422°E	92003-CLT-0004-01 Info	Place des Tilleuls ('plein van de lindebomen')
Former Town Hall ^{(nl)} ^{(fr)}		Andenne	place du Perron	50.485967°N 5.098412°E	92003-CLT-0005-01 Info	Oud raadhuis More images
"Tchestia di Scovie" House ^{(nl)} ^{(fr)}		Andenne	rue Winand n°36c	50.485827°N 5.101061°E	92003-CLT-0006-01 Info	Huis "Tchestia di Scovie" More images
"Sainte-Begge" House ^{(nl)} ^{(fr)}		Andenne	place Sainte-Begge n°6	50.486421°N 5.101185°E	92003-CLT-0007-01 Info	Huis "Sainte-Begge" More images
Church of St. Pierre ^{(nl)} ^{(fr)}		Andenne		50.494626°N 5.112513°E	92003-CLT-0008-01 Info	Kerk Saint-Pierre: toren en middenschip dat grenst aan oude delen More images
Church of St. Firmin ^{(nl)} ^{(fr)}		Andenne		50.471108°N 5.034006°E	92003-CLT-0009-01 Info	Kerk Saint-Firmin en esemble van kerk, de begraafplaats zowel oud als modern More images
St. Maurice de Sclayn Church ^{(nl)} ^{(fr)}		Andenne	Sclayn	50.489549°N 5.028100°E	92003-CLT-0011-01 Info	Kerk Saint-Maurice de Sclayn More images
Samson Rocks ^{(nl)} ^{(fr)}		Andenne		50.465249°N 4.996450°E	92003-CLT-0012-01 Info	
Tower of the farm of Houssoy ^{(nl)} ^{(fr)}		Andenne		50.504680°N 4.996974°E	92003-CLT-0013-01 Info	Toren van de boerderij van Houssoy en het ensemble van de boerderij en de omliggende terreinen More images
Chapel of St. Martin ^{(nl)} ^{(fr)}		Andenne		50.501157°N 5.115192°E	92003-CLT-0014-01 Info	
Atrive farm ^{(nl)} ^{(fr)}		Andenne	rue du Château n°2	50.498885°N 5.077786°E	92003-CLT-0015-01 Info	Boerderij van Atrive More images
church of St. Etienne ^{(nl)} ^{(fr)}		Andenne		50.500479°N 5.078195°E	92003-CLT-0016-01 Info	Kerk Saint-Etienne More images
Site of the chapel of St. Martin ^{(nl)} ^{(fr)}		Andenne		50.501222°N 5.113946°E	92003-CLT-0018-01 Info	
Tonglet-Magnée Building ^{(nl)} ^{(fr)}		Andenne	Sclayn	50.489518°N 5.027139°E	92003-CLT-0019-01 Info	
Old house ^{(nl)} ^{(fr)}		Andenne	rue Charles Lapierre n°2	50.486184°N 5.098546°E	92003-CLT-0020-01 Info	Huis: gevels, daken, uitgezonderd de aanbouwen aan de achterzijde, verharde binnenplaats, voetgangerspoort en omliggende muur More images
Vaudaigle Farm ^{(nl)} ^{(fr)}		Andenne		50.475048°N 5.064800°E	92003-CLT-0021-01 Info	
Castle Bonneville ^{(nl)} ^{(fr)}		Andenne		50.470008°N 5.034322°E	92003-CLT-0023-01 Info	Kasteel van Bonneville: gevels en daken van de oude delen, uitgezonderd de westvleugel als deel van de naburige boerderij, en het ensemble van het kasteel en diens omgeving More images
Dhuy Farm ^{(nl)} ^{(fr)}		Andenne		50.470034°N 5.035033°E	92003-CLT-0024-01 Info	Boerderij van Dhuy en tiendschuur (gevels en daken, met uitzondering van de aanbouw aan de binnenplaats tegen de noordvleugel bezet door schuren) en het ensemble van de boerderij en omliggende terreinen More images
La Croix Farmhouse ^{(nl)} ^{(fr)}		Andenne		50.467019°N 5.112782°E	92003-CLT-0025-01 Info	
Church of St. Rémy ^{(nl)} ^{(fr)}		Andenne		50.513994°N 5.064676°E	92003-CLT-0026-01 Info	
Farm-castle called "Ferme Libois" ^{(nl)} ^{(fr)}		Andenne		50.513186°N 5.063863°E	92003-CLT-0027-01 Info	
Farmhouse ^{(nl)} ^{(fr)}		Andenne	rue de Ville-en-Warêt n°250	50.504853°N 4.982947°E	92003-CLT-0028-01 Info	
Church of Notre-Dame ^{(nl)} ^{(fr)}		Andenne		50.469964°N 4.993593°E	92003-CLT-0029-01 Info	Kerk Notre-Dame: de toren, de toegang en de grafstenen op de begane grond van het interieur
Gate of Vierge Marie ^{(nl)} ^{(fr)}		Andenne		50.519833°N 5.056432°E	92003-CLT-0030-01 Info	Potale de la Vierge Marie en instelling beschermingszone More images
Place de Sclayn ^{(nl)} ^{(fr)}		Andenne		50.489808°N 5.027574°E	92003-CLT-0031-01 Info	
Site of "Sclaigneaux" and "Haies Monet" ^{(nl)} ^{(fr)}		Andenne		50.495720°N 5.035171°E	92003-CLT-0032-01 Info	
"des Fusillés" Cemetery ^{(nl)} ^{(fr)}		Andenne	quai des Fusillés	50.492576°N 5.093168°E	92003-CLT-0033-01 Info	Begraafplaats genaamd "des Fusillés"
Paleolithic caves ^{(nl)} ^{(fr)}		Andenne		50.482969°N 5.021095°E	92003-CLT-0034-01 Info	
Former school gym ^{(nl)} ^{(fr)}		Andenne	rue Adeline Henin n°3	50.487167°N 5.099703°E	92003-CLT-0035-01 Info	
Music kiosk ^{(nl)} ^{(fr)}		Andenne	place Wauters	50.499468°N 5.080313°E	92003-CLT-0037-01 Info	Muziekkiosk en instelling beschermingszone More images
Old building ^{(nl)} ^{(fr)}		Andenne	place des Tilleuls n°48	50.489755°N 5.096110°E	92003-CLT-0038-01 Info	Gebouw: straatgevel, dak en lobby More images
"Les demoiselles" Rocks ^{(nl)} ^{(fr)}		Andenne		50.452171°N 5.013349°E	92003-CLT-0040-01 Info	Ensemble van de rotsen genaamd "Les demoiselles" bij het gehucht van Forges in de vallei van Samson More images
Presbytery of St. Maurice Church ^{(nl)} ^{(fr)}		Andenne	Sclayn	50.489620°N 5.027415°E	92003-CLT-0041-01 Info	De pastorie van de kerk Saint-Maurice de Sclayn
Collegiate Church of St. Begge ^{(nl)} ^{(fr)}		Andenne		50.486864°N 5.100867°E	92003-PEX-0001-01 Info	Collegiale kerk Sainte-Begge More images
Paleolithic caves of Sclayn ^{(nl)} ^{(fr)}		Andenne		50.482969°N 5.021095°E	92003-PEX-0002-01 Info	De palaeolithische grotten van Sclayn More images

== See also ==
- List of protected heritage sites in Namur (province)
