= Anspach (surname) =

Anspach is a surname. Notable people with the surname include:

- Eugène Anspach (1833–1890), Belgian lawyer and civil servant
- Frederick Rinehart Anspach (1815–1867), American Lutheran clergyman, writer and editor
- Henri Anspach (1882–1979), Belgian épée (Olympic champion) and foil fencer
- Jules Anspach (1829–1879), Belgian politician
- Paul Anspach (1882–1991), Belgian épée and foil fencer, two-time Olympic champion
- Ralph Anspach (1926–2022), American economics professor
- Sólveig Anspach (1960–2015), Icelandic-French film director and screenwriter
- Susan Anspach (1942–2018), American stage and motion picture actress

== See also ==
- Anspach family
