= Sclayn =

Sclayn Scleyin (Walloon)
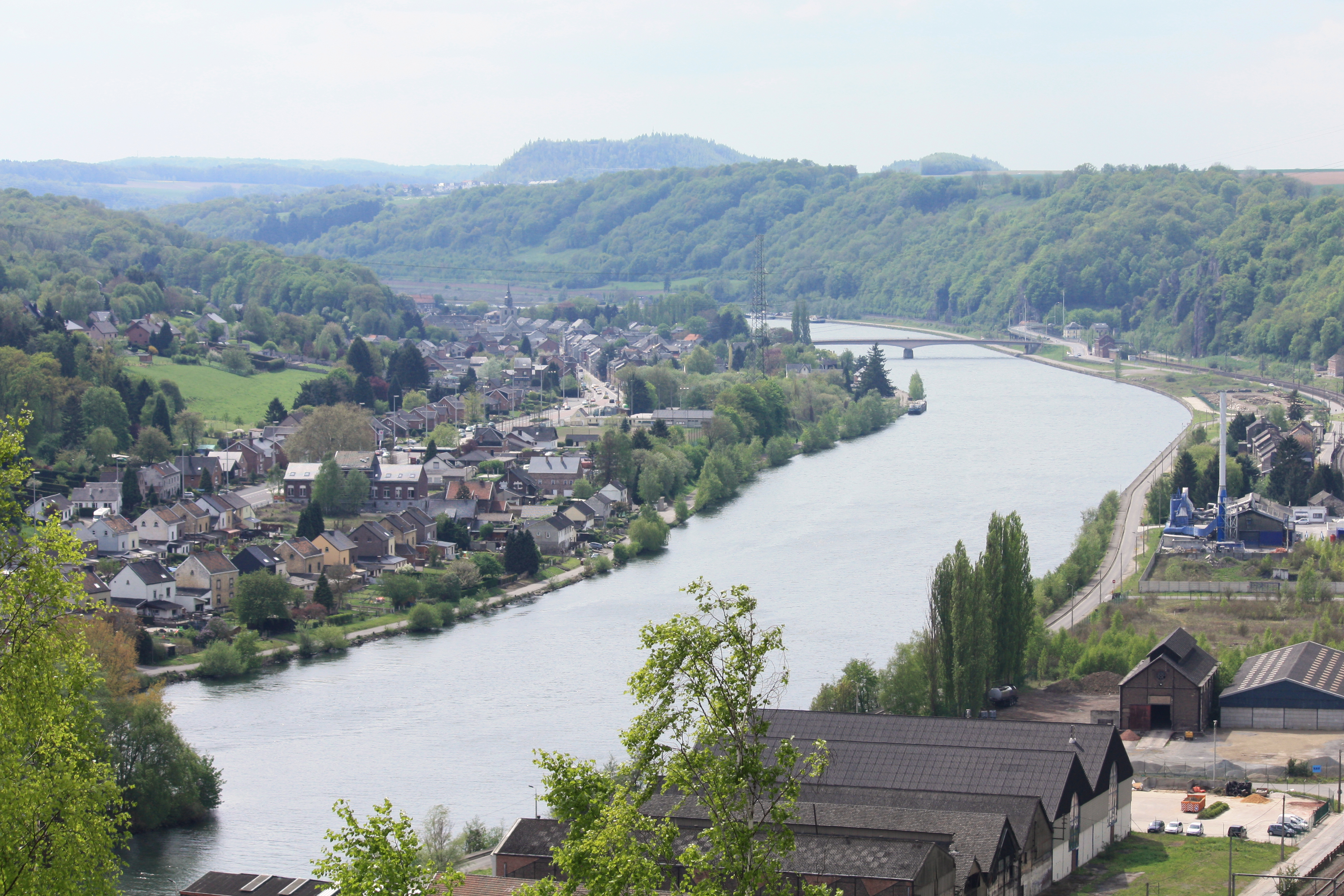
- Sclayn

- Location within Belgium Location within Europe
- Coordinates: 50°29′24″N 05°01′37″E
- Country: Belgium
- Region: Wallonia
- Province: Namur
- Municipality: Andenne

Sclayn (French pronunciation: [sklaɛ̃]; Walloon: Scleyin) is a town of Wallonia and a district of the municipality of Andenne, located in the province of Namur, Belgium.

It is located by the river Meuse.

Sclayn developed around the collegiate church dedicated to Saint Maurice. The church was founded by monks from Kornelimünster Abbey around 1072, and a college of canons was founded here by Emperor Henry IV in 1106. The Romanesque church is still preserved in the town, and contains a large crucifix from the 14th century, among other historical furnishings. The clergy house of the church is also medieval. The Scladina or Sclayn Cave is also located in Sclayn.
