= Roger Laboureur =

Belgian sports journalist (1935–2025)

- Laboureur in 2014
- Born: Roger Laboureur; 13 July 1935; Andenne, Belgium
- Died: 14 December 2025 (aged 90)
- Occupations: Sports journalist, football commentator

Roger Laboureur (13 July 1935 – 14 December 2025) was a Belgian sports journalist.

== Life and career ==
Laboureur was born in Andenne on 13 July 1935. He worked as a sports journalist for RTBF for the duration of his career.

Laboureur died on 14 December 2025, at the age of 90.
