= Frederick Rinehart Anspach =

American Lutheran clergyman and writer (1815–1867)

Frederick Rinehart Anspach (January 1815 – 16 September 1867) was an American Lutheran clergyman, author and editor.

== Biography ==
Frederick Anspach was born and raised in central Pennsylvania. He graduated from the Pennsylvania College in Gettysburg, Pennsylvania during 1839, and the Lutheran Theological Seminary at Gettysburg in 1841. He was ordained into the Lutheran ministry. He subsequently served as a pastor within the Evangelical Lutheran Synod of East Pennsylvania. From 1841 until 1850, he served as minister at St. Peter's Lutheran Church in Barren Hill, Pennsylvania. He also served at Hagerstown, Maryland.

== Publications ==
A sermon delivered on the occasion of the death of Henry Clay was his first publication. His Sons of the Sires, Sepulchres of our Departed (Philadelphia, 1854), The Two Pilgrims (1857), and other works appeared in rapid succession. In 1857, he moved to Baltimore, Maryland, where he became a contributor to the Lutheran Observer, and in 1858 its principal editor, in which office he continued until 1861. He died in Baltimore during 1867.
