= Ansbach (automobile) =

The Ansbach was a German automobile manufactured from 1910 to 1913 by the forerunner of Faun, a company known for its trucks, cars and buses. The 1559 cc, four-cylinder 14 hp (10 kW) Ansbach touring car was known as the Kautz.

In 1917, the company merged with the Nuremberg fire extinguishing equipment, automobile truck, and vehicle factory Karl Schmidt to form the company Fahrzeugfabriken Ansbach und Nürnberg AG, which was abbreviated in 1920 to FAUN-Werke AG. Due to the inflation in the 1920s, the Faun factories also fell into financial difficulties. In 1926, a division was made and the factory in Ansbach regained its original name Fahrzeugfabrik Ansbach AG. In 1926, the Ansbach Express was introduced. The small truck with a payload of 600 kg had a two-cylinder engine from the company Motosacoche with 592 cc, a bore of 64 mm, and a stroke of 92 mm. The vehicle could reach a speed of 45 km/h with the 15 hp engine power. The vehicle was produced from 1926 to 1928, in the year the company went bankrupt. The insolvency administrator allowed the depletion of inventory for about another year, so it is possible that some vehicles were still manufactured in 1929.
