= Maizeret =

Maizeret Måjhret (Walloon)
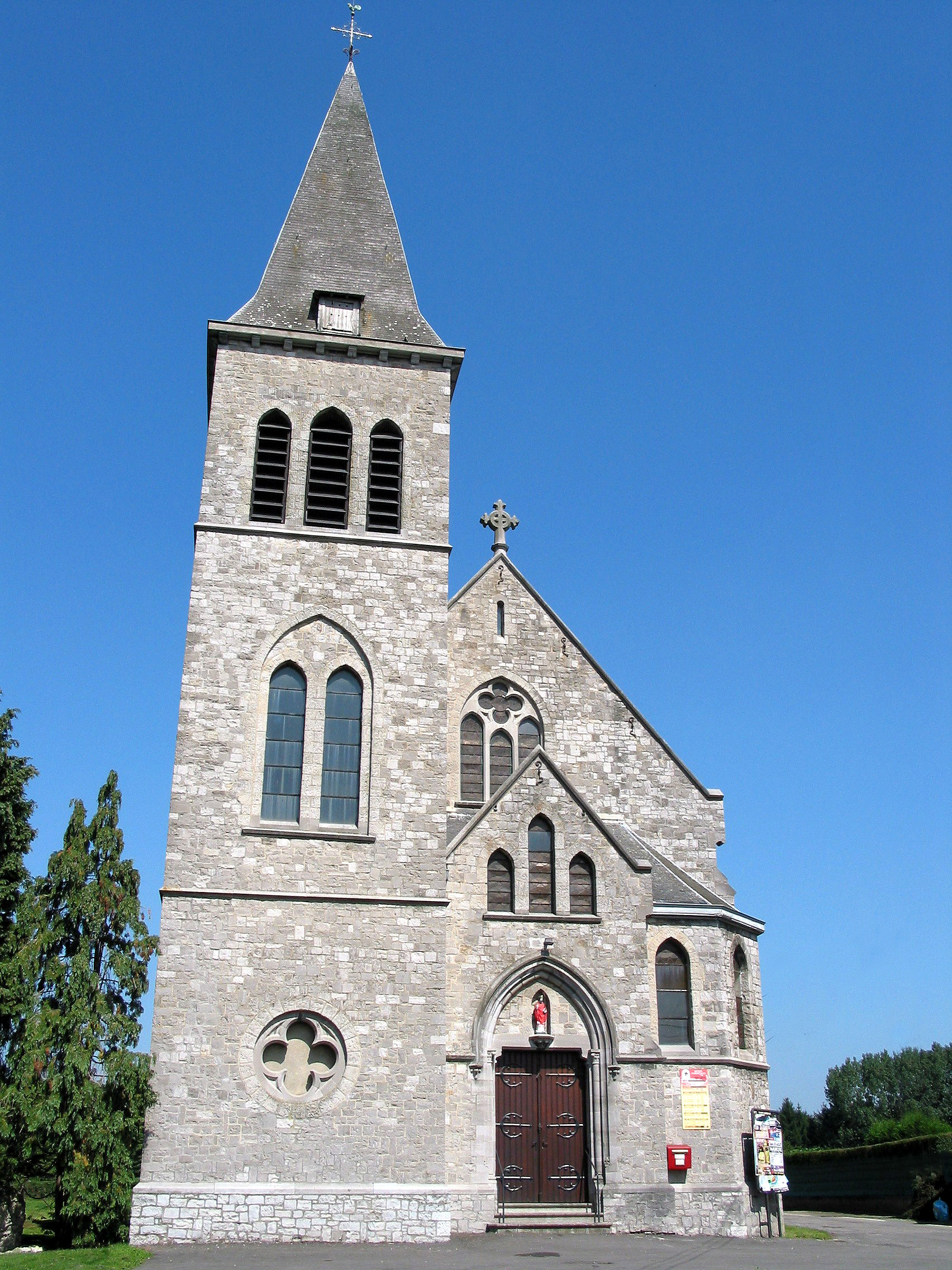

- Coat of arms
- Interactive map of Maizeret
- Coordinates: 55°27′N 4°58′W
- Country: Belgium
- Region: Wallonia
- Province: Namur
- Municipality: Andenne

Population
  - Total: 324 (as of 01/01/2,006)
- Postal code: 5300
- Area code: 081

Maizeret (French pronunciation: [mɛzʁɛ]; Walloon: Måjhret) is a village of Wallonia and a district of the municipality of Andenne, located in the province of Namur, Belgium.

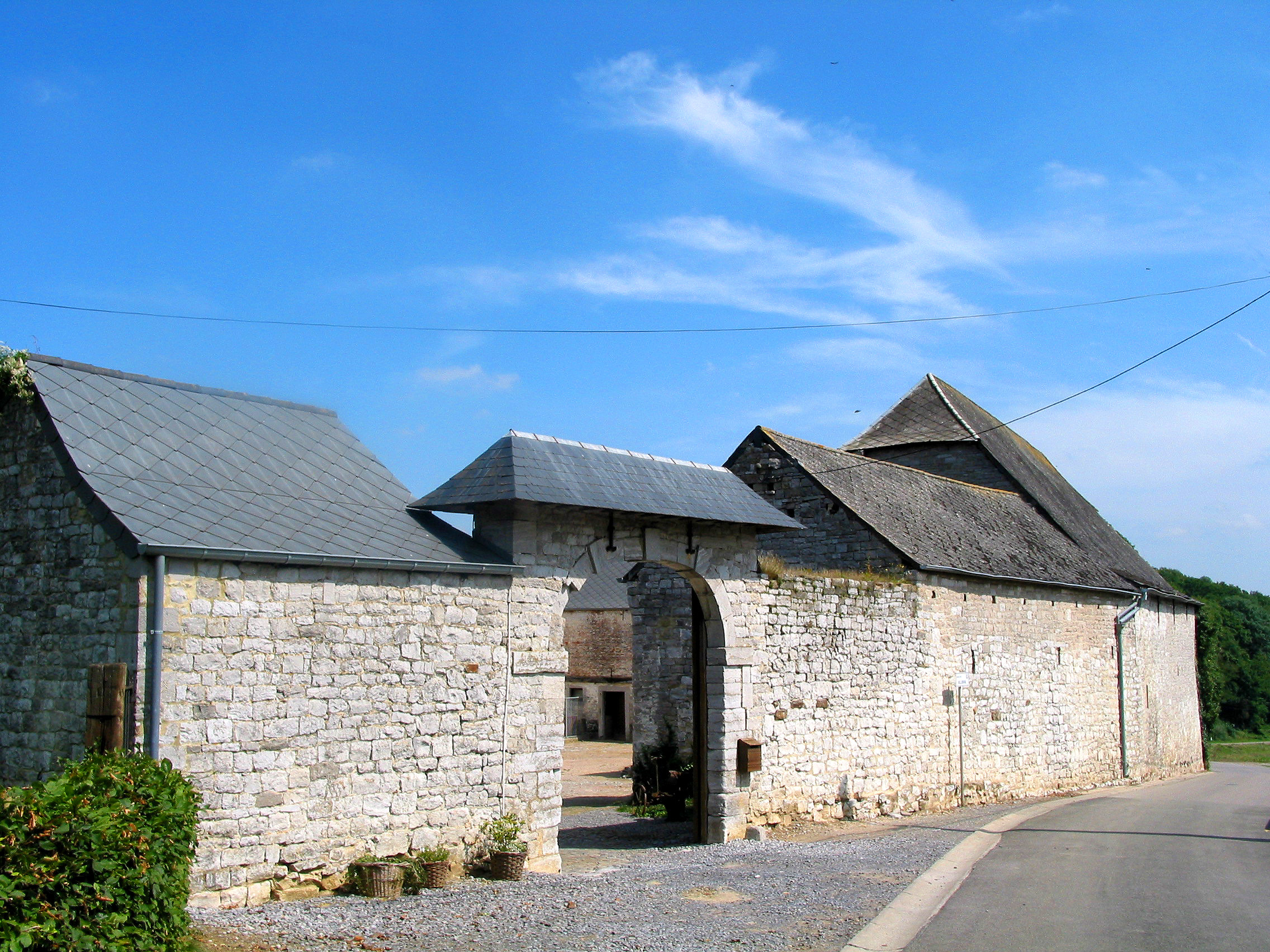
Old farm.

It was a municipality before the fusion of the Belgian municipalities in 1977.

- Places: Bialy, Biche, Core, Gawday, Haie Marie, Moisnil, Sur le Try, Tasseneur, Trieuchamps, and Vil-en-Val

== Monuments ==
- The Saint-Martin church from 1926.
- The Écritures de Maizeret

== Château ==
- The Château du Moisnil, renovated in 1902 by Octave Flanneau (1860–1937) and currently owned by the Ursel family.

== See also ==
- Andenne
- Chateau du Moisnil
