= Dievoet =

Dievoet (/ˈdiːvʊt/) is a place name from which the surnames Van Dievoet and Vandievoet are derived.

== Surname ==
Coat of arms of the Van Dievoet family of Brussels.

As a surname, it is found mainly in Belgium as Van Dievoet or Vandievoet, and may refer to:

Members of the Van Dievoet family of Brussels (Vandive in Paris) (Divutius in Latin) such as:

- Philippe Van Dievoet called Vandive (1654–1738), goldsmith and jeweller
- Peter Van Dievoet (1661–1729), sculptor and designer of ornamental architectural features in London and Brussels
- Guillaume Van Dievoet (1680–1706), printer of the Dauphin
- Nicolas Felix Van Dievoet (1710–1792), counsellor of the king of France
- Augustus Van Dievoet (1803–1865), in Latin Augustus Divutius, Belgian jurist, lawyer, historian and Latin writer
- Jules Van Dievoet (1844–1917), Belgian jurist and lawyer
- Eugène Van Dievoet (1862–1937), Belgian architect
- Henri Van Dievoet (1869−1931), Belgian architect
- Gabriel Van Dievoet (1875–1934), Belgian decorator and sgraffitist
- Germaine Van Dievoet (1899–1990), Belgian olympic swimmer
- Florence Van Dievoet née Descampe (1969–), Belgian professional golfer
- Léon Van Dievoet (1907–1993), Belgian architect, painter, engraver and drawer.

Coat of arms of the family of Baron Émile van Dievoet.

Members of the family of Belgian politician Baron Émile van Dievoet such as:

- Baron Émile van Dievoet (1886–1967), Belgian minister of Justice
- Guido van Dievoet (nl), Belgian law historian
- Walter van Dievoet (nl; fr), Belgian expert on goldsmithing;

Members of the Vandievoet or Van Dievoet families, Brabantian families from the villages of Haren, Diegem, Evere, Schaerbeek, Meise, in Flemish Brabant such as:

- Jules Vandievoet (fr) (1885–1947), Belgian painter
- Jacques Vandievoet (fr) (1923–1993), Belgian poet
- Hendrik Van Dievoet (nl; fr), burgomaster of Meise from 1891 to 1904.

== Place name ==
Dievoet is a place located in Uccle (Belgium).

== Etymologies ==
There are two possible etymologies :

1. Diet + voorde, place name of Germanic origin.
  - From Diet meaning people and voorde meaning ford. Dietvoorde thus meaning "public ford".
2. Divo + ritum, place name of Celtic origin.
  - Divoritum meaning "sacred ford".

For more informations about the etymologies of the name, see Dievoort.

== Variations ==
- Dievoort, a related surname and place name
