= Dievoort =

Dievoort or Dietvoort is a place name and a surname.

== Place name ==
Dievoort or Dietvoort is a place in the region of Breda in The Netherlands. Not to be confused with the locality Diervoort, on the border of the municipalities of Nijmegen and Wijchen, where there is a Diervoortseweg (Diervoort Road), which is a place currently composed only of a large cheese farm.

== Etymologies ==
- 1) Diet+voorde, place name of Germanic origin.

The place name Dievoort, found in the region of Breda (Dietvoort or Dievoort) is composed of the two words Diet, which means "people" (see Middle High German diet "people" proto-Germanic * þeudā, where adjective deutsch / duits, equivalent to the old Irish tūath, proto-Celtic * teutā meaning also "people" or "tribe" and the word voorde which means "ford" (voorde in Dutch, like Furt in German and ford in English of protogermanic * furdu equivalent of proto-Celtic * φritu- Latinized in ritum, old Welsh laughs, modern rhyd and protofrançais roy, king / ray, rai (still in place names), equivalents of Latin portus.This place name thus means the "public ford" is an important ford, managed by the tribe or the people and often defended by a fort or a castle.

Other fords are designated by their use: koevoort, dierenvoort, riddervoorde etc. intended for cows, animals or riders.

- 2) Divo+ritum, place name of Celtic origin.

There are other places of this name such as that of Duivenvoorde, Dievoert, Dievoet, which would come from the Celtic Divoritum and would mean a "sacred ford", divoritum, or a ford dedicated to the god Týr (Tiwaz), (Zeus), or to a goddess (dia) waters. Thus Jort (Calvados), formerly Iort, Diort and Divort, would come from the Gaulish Divoritum.

== Other places with the same etymology ==
- in Belgium:
  - Dievoet, is reported in the Nomina Geographica Neerlandica, as being a place in Uccle (Brussels).
- in Germany there are many places or cities named Ditfurt, Dietfurt etc. which have the same etymology as Dievoort:
  - Ditfurt, quoted in 974 in the Latinized form Deotfurdum, then Dhietvorden (1148), Ditvorde (1288), Ditforde (1458), fortified village in the north-east of the Harz province, in the valley of the Bode.
  - Dietfurt an der Altmühl, city in the province of Neumarkt in the Upper Palatinate in Bavaria, where is also the Convent of Dietfurt. Dietfurt, part of Vilsingen [de], district of Inzigkofen in the region of Sigmaringen, Baden-Württemberg.
  - Dietfurt in Mittelfranken, former village which became a district of the city of Treuchtlingen in the province of Weißenburg-Gunzenhausen, Bavaria.
  - Oberdietfurt (formerly Dietfurt), in Bavaria dependent on Massing.
  - Unterdietfurt (formerly Dietfurt), in Bavaria dependent on Massing.
  - Tiefurt, near Weimar.
- in Austria
  - Dietfurt hamlet forming part of the municipality of Sankt Peter am Hart.
- in Poland:
  - Dietfurt was from 1939 to 1945 the name of the city of Żnin.
- in Switzerland:
  - Dietfurt SG, a dependent village in Bütschwil (St. Gallen).
- in the Grand Duchy of Luxembourg:
  - There was also a Diefort Molin, located near Steinsel.
- in the Netherlands:
  - The place Duivenvoorde, Dievenvoorde or Dievoert, in Holland, stronghold of the van Wassenaar family, has the same etymology.

== Surnames from the name Dievoort ==
The names Dievoort (often written Dievoet in Southern Dutch) or Ditfurth (High German) are also found in many surnames :

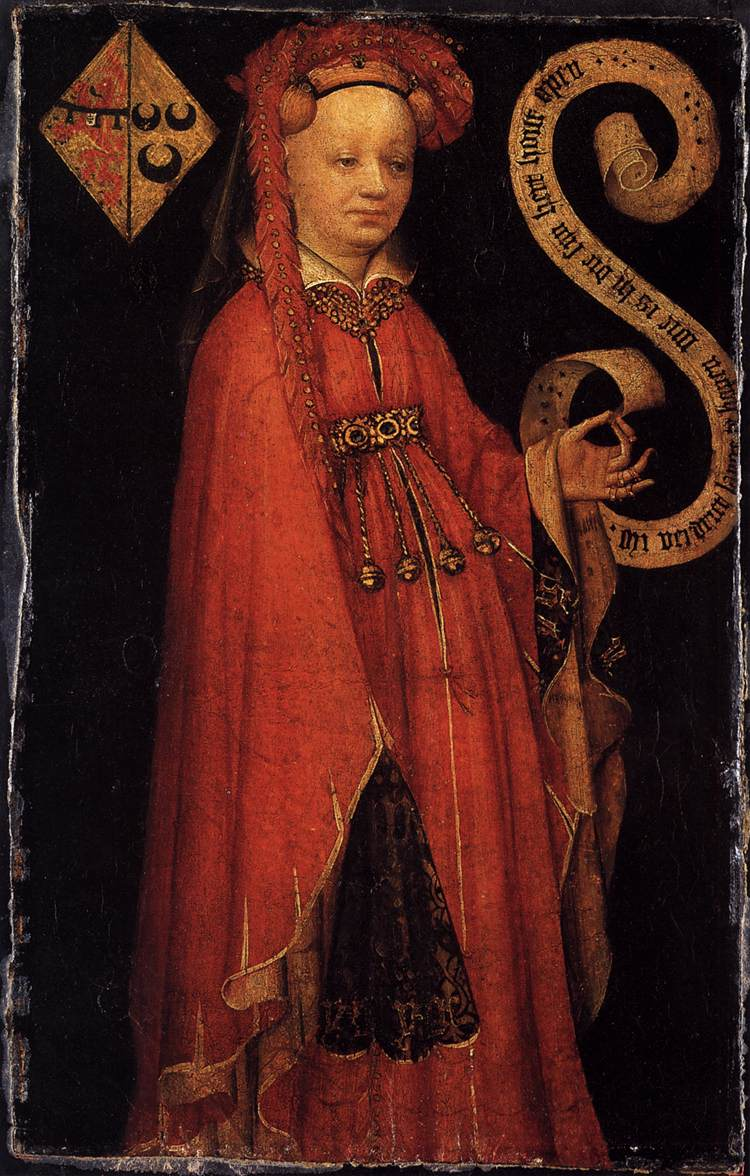
Lysbeth van Duvoorde, portrait with this inscription : "Afbeeltsel van Juffer Lijsbeth van Duvoorde, Heer Dircks dochter", circa 1430.

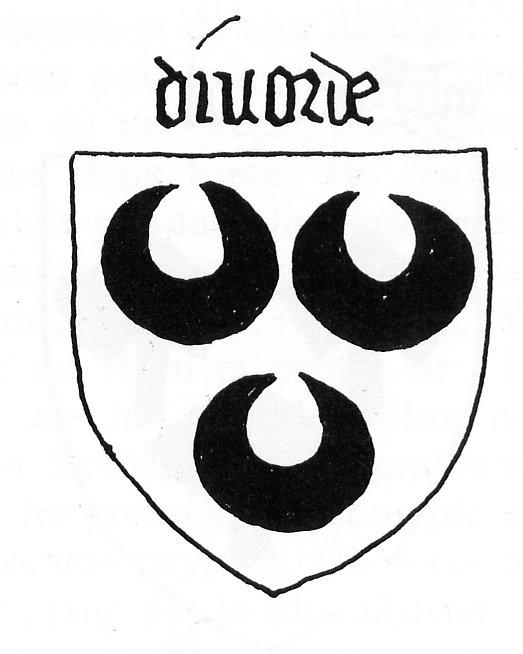
Arms Divorde, around 1440 (Armorial de la Toison d'Or et de l'Europe, fol. 34).

- de Divorde,
- von Ditfurth,
- van Dietvoort,
- de Divoort (in Dunkerque),
- de Diéfort, Diefort,
- Ditford (in England),
- van Ditford (Netherlands),
- Vandiford in the United States,
- Duuvoort, Duvordt, Duvoort, Du-voort, Duvevord, Duvevoirt, Duvenvoorde,
- van Dietvoort,
- van Dietvoirt: in Lier one Peter van Dietvoirt was cited in 1418.
- Verdievoert: in Vorst one Hendrick Verdievoert was cited in 1515.
- Dievort: in 1539 one Peter Dievort was cited in Deurne-Anvers.
- Dyvoet: name of a Dutch printer from Leiden. Published in 1659: Weyman, Daniel, Antwoorde in versoeck, vande heeren Weyman ende Copez, Leiden, printed by Jan Dyvoet
- Dyvoort ou Dijvoort: Cornelis Dyvoort, printer in Gouda between 1654 and 1697, quoted from 1662 to 1697 as "stadsdrukker", "printer of the city".
- Dyvoet is also mentioned in 1780 in the archives of the Plotho Fund, Rijksarchief, Kortrijk: n ° 4243, year 1780, Sint-Eloois-Vijve, "Proces voor de Wet van Sint-Eloois-Vijve" between A. Cottens and A. Dyvoet
- van Dievoort, (especially in Belgium in the province of Antwerp). In the novel "Silver and Nobility" of the Flemish writer Henri Conscience, one of the imaginary characters is a certain knight Van Dievoort.
- van Dietfoert : In Bergen-op-Zoon an Elisabeth Ren was mentioned in 1663 as the widow of Jan van Dietfoert.
- van Divoert, in 1605, a Fransen van Divoert is quoted in Mechelen, as having taken an oath to the guild of the brewers.
- van Dievoedt, this spelling can be found in the novel by the Dutch novelist Julie van Mechelen entitled Het geheim van de tweeling, edition "Een Favoriet Roman", Nr. 18, Studio 4, where one of the characters is Julius van Dievoedt.
- Vandievoet, or Van Dievoet:
  - Vandievoet family, Brabant family from the villages of Haren, Diegem, Evere, Schaerbeek, Meise, in Flemish Brabant.
  - van Dievoet family, family of Belgian politician Emile van Dievoet.
  - Van Dievoet family, bourgeois family from Brussels. Called Vandive in Paris.

== People with this name and its variants ==
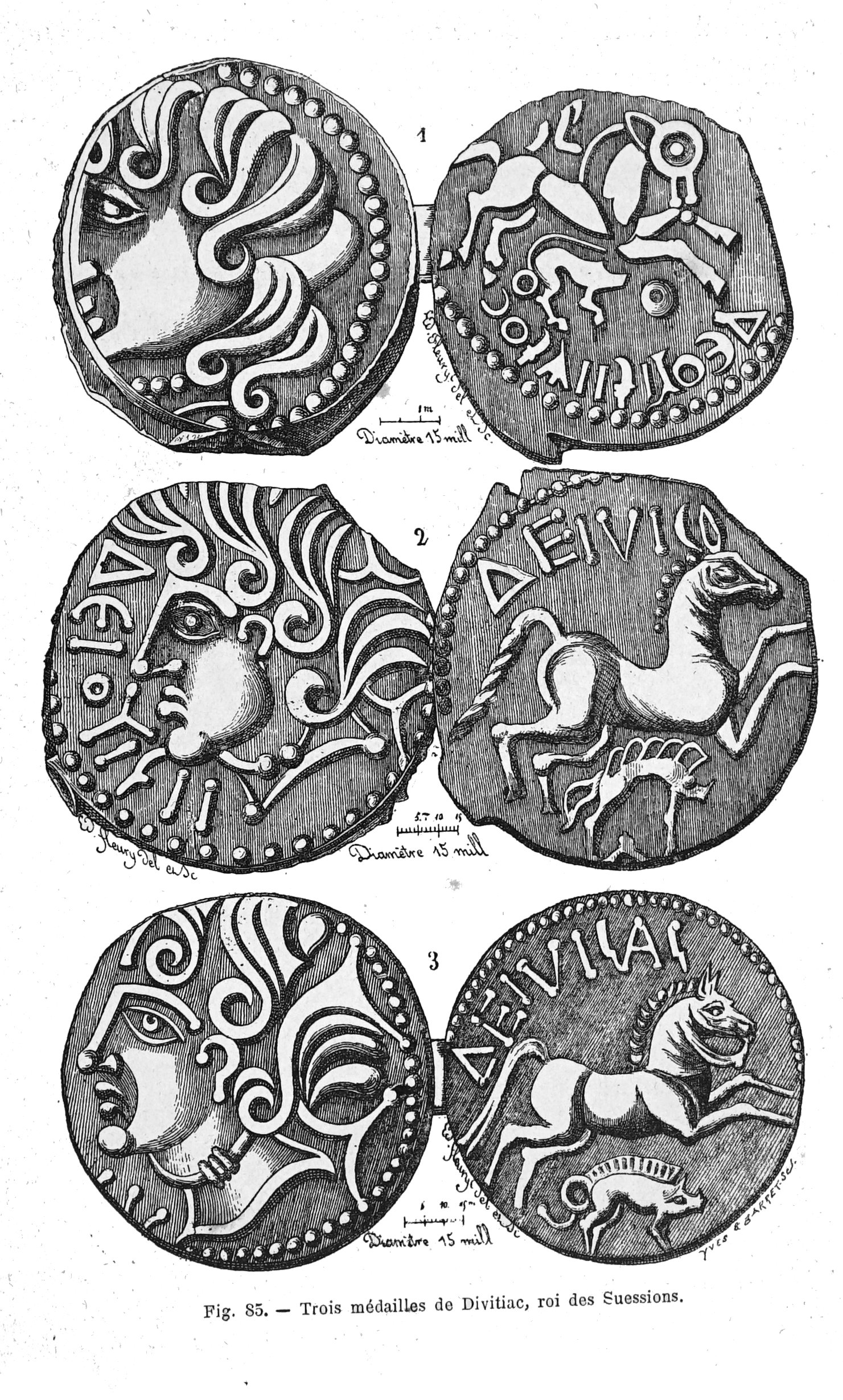
Money of Divitiacus king of the Suessiones.

Notable people with the name Dietfurt or Dievoort or Dievoet etc. include:

=== In Antiquity ===
- Divitiacus a druid, friend of Cicero.
- Divitiacus, king of the Belgic nation of the Suessiones in the early 1st century BC.

=== The German noble family von Ditfurth (in the Harz) ===
- Anton von Ditfurth (1588–1650), German writer and academician.
- Franz Dietrich von Ditfurth (1738–1813), German theoretician of Freemasonry.
- Wilhelm von Ditfurth, (1780–1855), general in the service of Prussia.
- Franz Wilhelm von Ditfurth (1801–1880), scholar and musicologist.
- Hoimar von Ditfurth (1921–1989), German doctor and journalist.
- Jutta Ditfurth (* 1951), German sociologist, writer and politician, daughter of Hoimar von Ditfurth
- Christian von Ditfurth (* 1953), German historian and independent author, son of Hoimar von Ditfurth

=== The noble German family von Dietfurt (Dietfurt Castle, Inzighofen) ===
- in 1095, the Heinrich brothers, Eberhard and Hermann von Dietfurt, were named as witnesses to the founding of the Alpirsbach Abbey.

=== Dittforth family, Germany ===
- Julius Dittforth, German politician.

=== Divoort family ===
- Joseph Divoort, Mayor of Uccle (Belgium).

=== Van Dievoort family ===
- Louis Van Dievoort, Antwerp painter.

== Heraldry ==
Family/person	Blazon	Image
One Divoort family (Holland)		
Another Divoort family (Holland)		
The Van Dievoet family, bourgeois of Brussels	Party per pale argent and sable, a tower gated embattled of 4 pieces counterchanged, debruised by an inescutcheon party per pale or and gules, a dexter human foot sole also counterchanged, the tower accompanied in chief of two six-pointed stars, one gules the other or, and at the base a crescent counterchanged.	
Peter Van Dievoet, sculptor, member of the Van Dievoet family above	Party per pale argent and sable, a tower gated counterchanged, debruised by an inescutcheon party per pale gules and or with a border counterchanged, the tower accompanied in chief of two six-pointed stars, one gules the other or, and at the base a crescent counterchanged.	
Family of Emile, Baron van Dievoet	Argent, a hand of justice gules, chapé gules, two crosses moline of the field	
One von Dietfurt family.		
The von Ditfurth family before the 15th century and since 1923		
The von Ditfurth family between the 15th century and 1923		
van Duvoorde family, also in French de Divorde	Argent, three crescents sable	
Willem van Duvenvoorde		
The Ditford family of London	or, three bars argent over all a saltier counterchanged, within a bordure invected gules	

== See also ==
- Dievoet

== Bibliography ==
- Chr Buiks, Laatmiddeleeuws Landschap en Veldnamen in de Baronie van Breda, p. 46
- Albert Joseph Carnoy, Origines des noms des communes de Belgique, y compris les noms des rivières et principaux hameaux, 1948.
- Frans Debrabandere et Peter De Baets, Woordenboek van de familienamen in België en Noord-Frankrijk = Dictionnaire des noms de famille de Belgique et du Nord de la France = Wörterbuch der Familiennamen in Belgien und Nordfrankreich = Dictionary of the surnames in Belgium and North France, Amsterdam et Anvers : Éditions L.J. Veen, 2003
- Nomina geographica Neerlandica, par la Koninklijk Nederlands Aardrijkskundig Genootschap.
