= Nicolas Félix Vandive =

French court official

Nicolas Félix Vandive Écuyer
- Born: 1712; Paris
- Died: 1 June 1792 (aged 79–80); Paris
- Occupation: court official
- Title: Écuyer
- Parent(s): Balthazar-Philippe Vandive and Françoise-Edmée de La Haye
- Family: Vandive family

Nicolas-Félix Van Dievoet (/ˈdiːvʊt/) called Vandive (/vɒ̃dɪv/), écuyer, (c.1710–1792) was a French court official

He was court clerk at the Grand Conseil (1743) and of the Conseil du Roi (King's Council), lawyer at the Parlement of Paris (Parliament of Paris) (cited in 1761) and conseiller notaire et secrétaire Maison et Couronne de France près la Cour du Parlement (counsellor, notary and secretary at the French Court for the Court of the Parliament).

== Biography ==
=== Origins ===
He was a member of the Vandive family, a parisian family of goldsmiths, a branch of the Van Dievoet family of Brussels. His father was the goldsmith Balthazar Philippe Vandive, who was consul of Paris in 1739.

His grandfather was Philippe van Dievoet called Vandive (1654-1738), goldsmith of the King, counsellor of the King, officier de la Garde Robe du Roi (officer of the King's wardrobe), consul of Paris, trustee of the Hôtel de ville of Paris.

His great-uncle was the sculptor Peter van Dievoet (1661-1729).

=== Career ===
Nicolas-Félix Vandive was cited as early from 26 April 1743, court clerk at the Grand Conseil, which conferred personal Nobility upon him from 1743 and hereditary Nobility from 1763 after 20 years on the job. The Almanach Royal of 1789 still mentions him as court clerk at the Grand Conseil.

Thanks to the Edict given at Versailles on 22 May 1775, which fixed the finances of the Grand Conseil, we can read that "We have also fixed the finances of the offices of first and principal clerk of the audience in our Grand Conseil to which the sieur Vandive is provided, at the sum of 25 thousand livres (pounds)."

He also exerted the ennobling office of conseiller notaire et secrétaire Maison et Couronne de France près la Cour du Parlement (counsellor, notary and secretary at the French Court for the Court of the Parliament). He succeeded in 1774, Étienne Timoléon Isabeau de Montval, who was guillotined in Paris in year II.

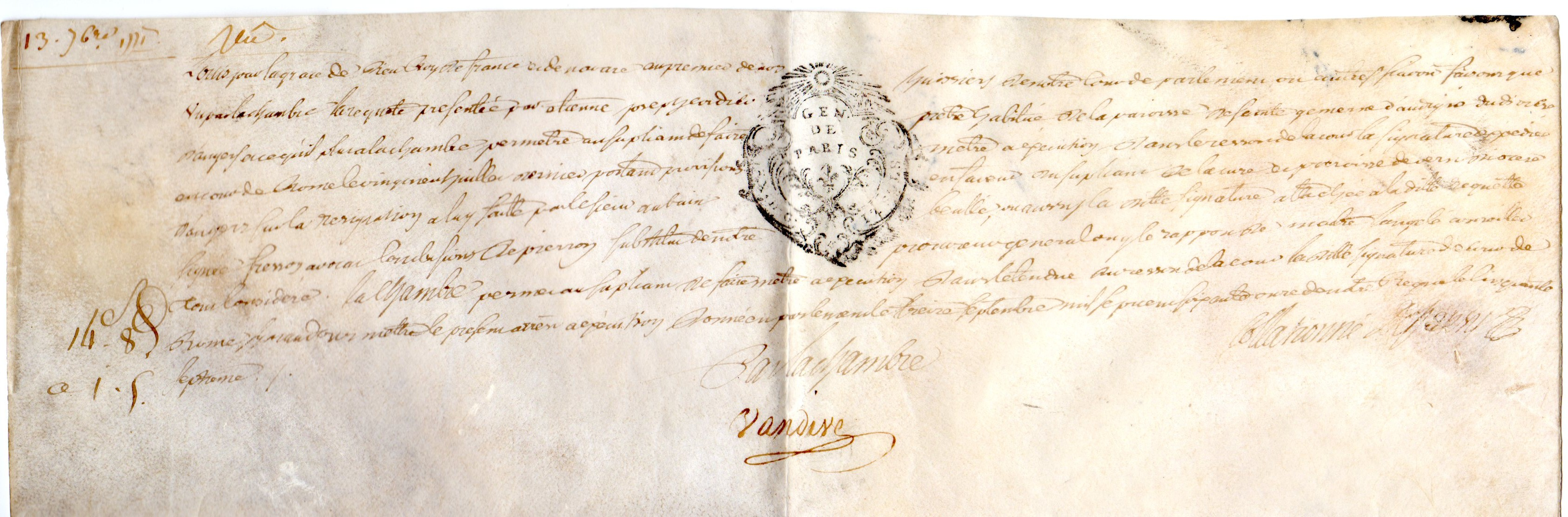
Parchment signed by Nicolas Felix Vandive on 13 September 1771

=== The death of King Louis XV ===
During the last illness of Louis XV, Vandive was sent, on Sunday 1 May 1774 by the Parlement of Paris to inquire on the health of the monarch, as the personal journal of Parisian bookseller Siméon-Prosper Hardy tells us: "The new court of the Parlement, according to ordinary practice, deputised Vandive, one of the first and principal court clerk of the Grand Chambre and of its notary-secretaries, to go to Versailles to obtain news on the King's health. But the secretary could only do this on the following Tuesday, because the Monday 2 May was a respected holiday." And Jean Cruppi in his biography of Linguet writes: "At the Palace, word was suddenly spreading that Louis XV was gravely ill. The Parlement, anxious, and feeling itself as ill as the King, extraordinarily assembled itself. On Tuesday 3 May, they sent their secretary, the sieur Vandive, to Versailles to obtain news of the King. The sieur Vandive, at his return, declared being received by the Duke of Aumont whom told him that the state of the King was Better. Despite this news, on 10 May (1774), we learned that the King was dead."

=== Gallery ===
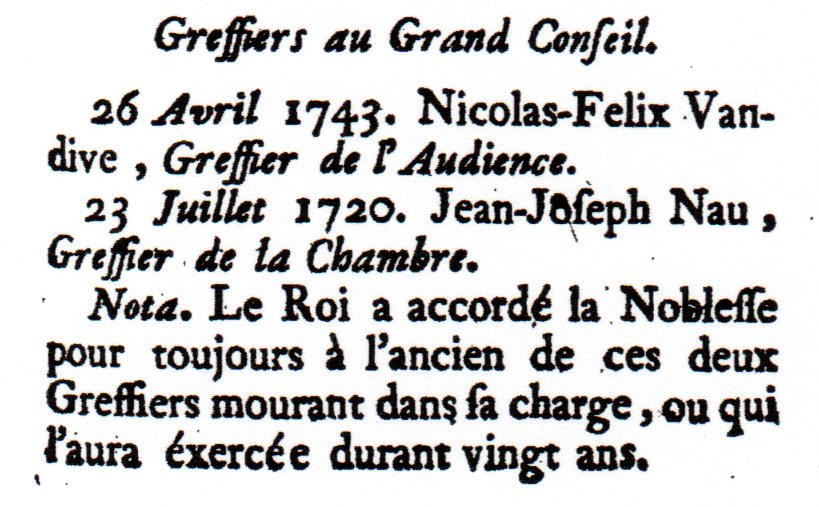
Proof of Nobility

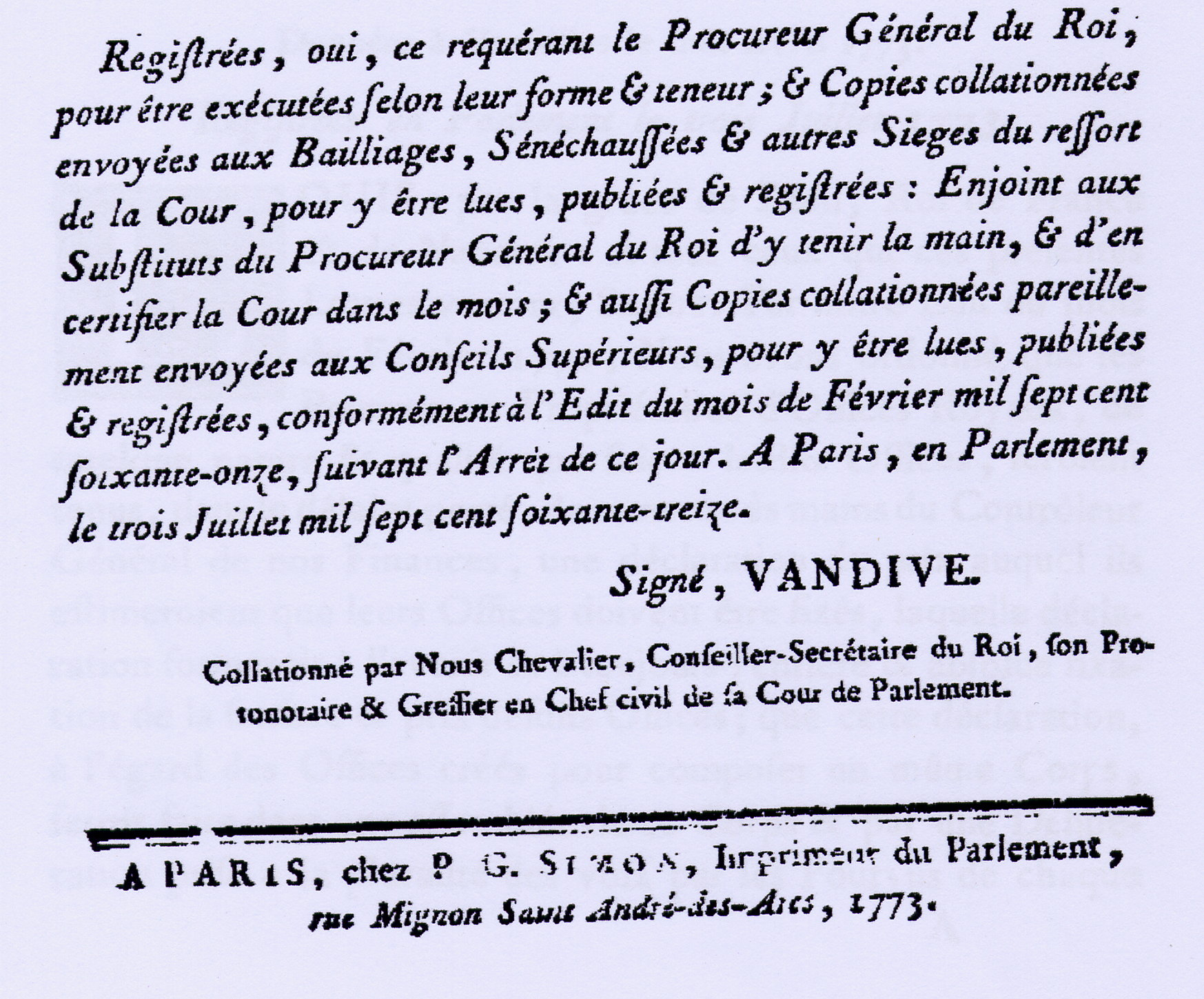
Printed letter patent of the King, signed Vandive

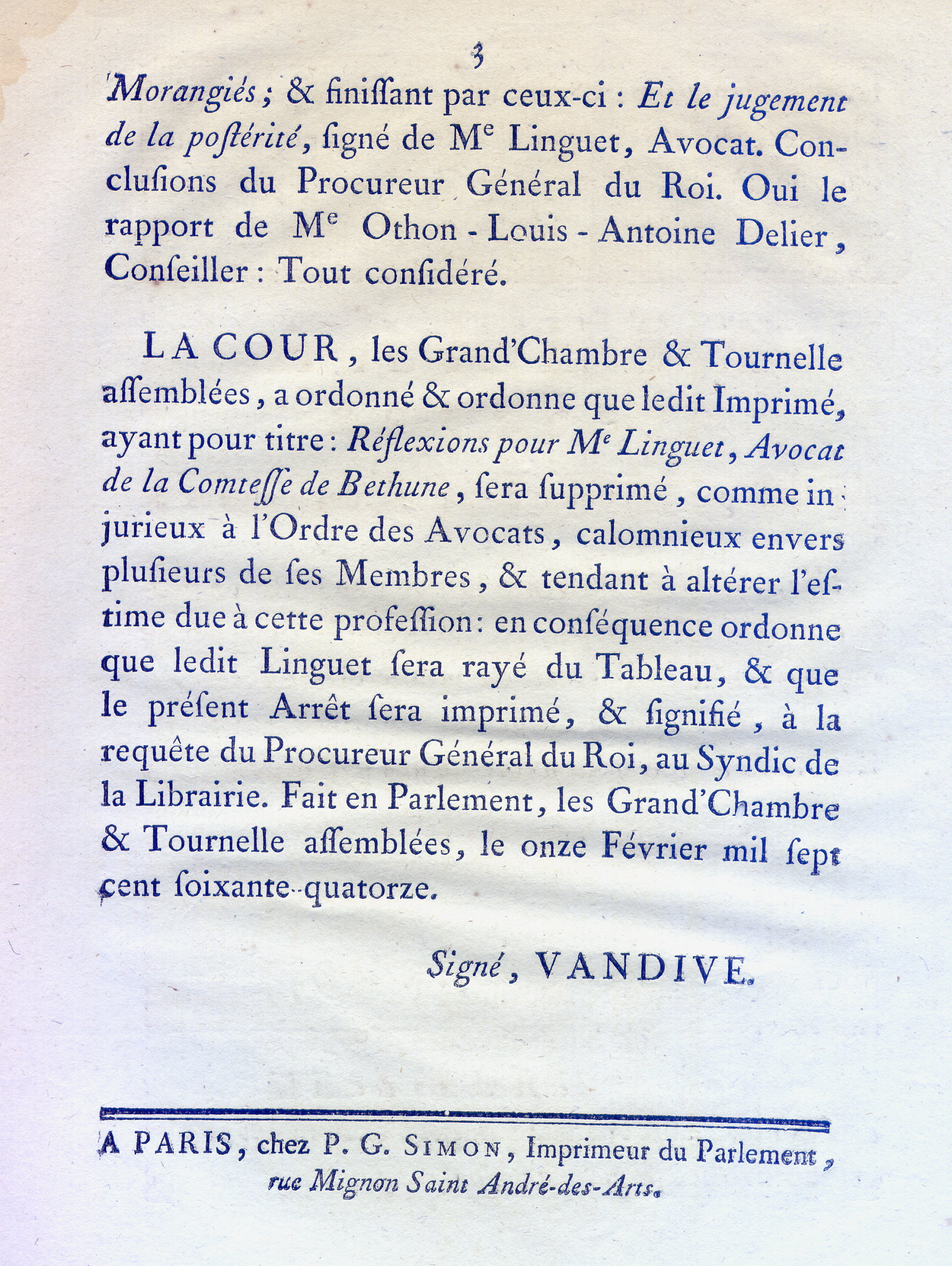
Document from the Parlement signed Vandive

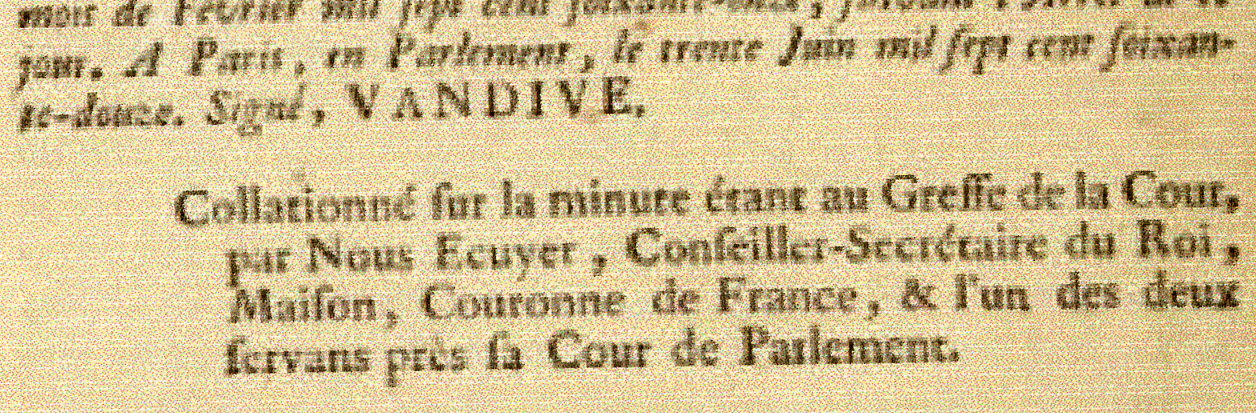
Document signed Vandive

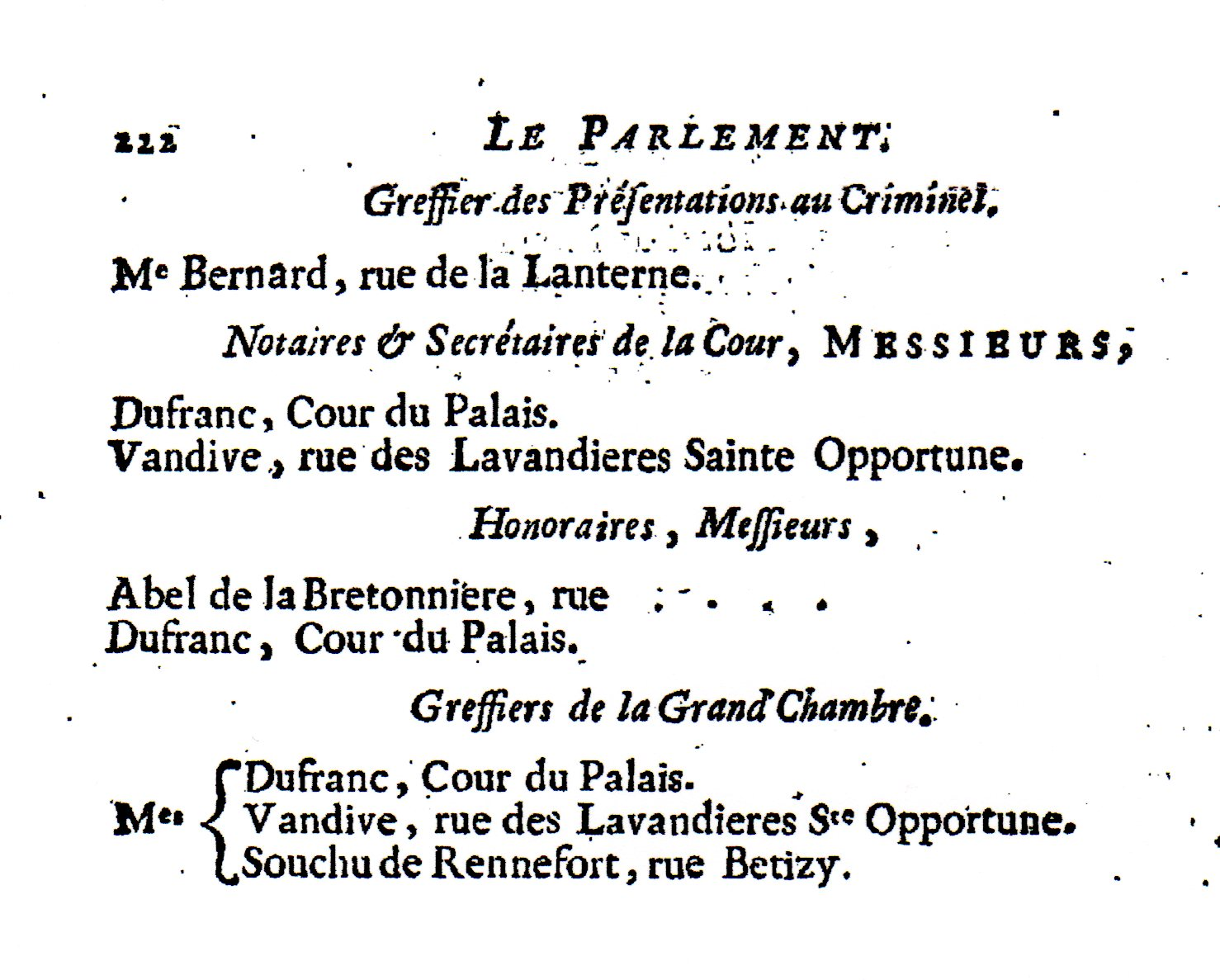
Almanach Royal of 1772 mentioning Vandive

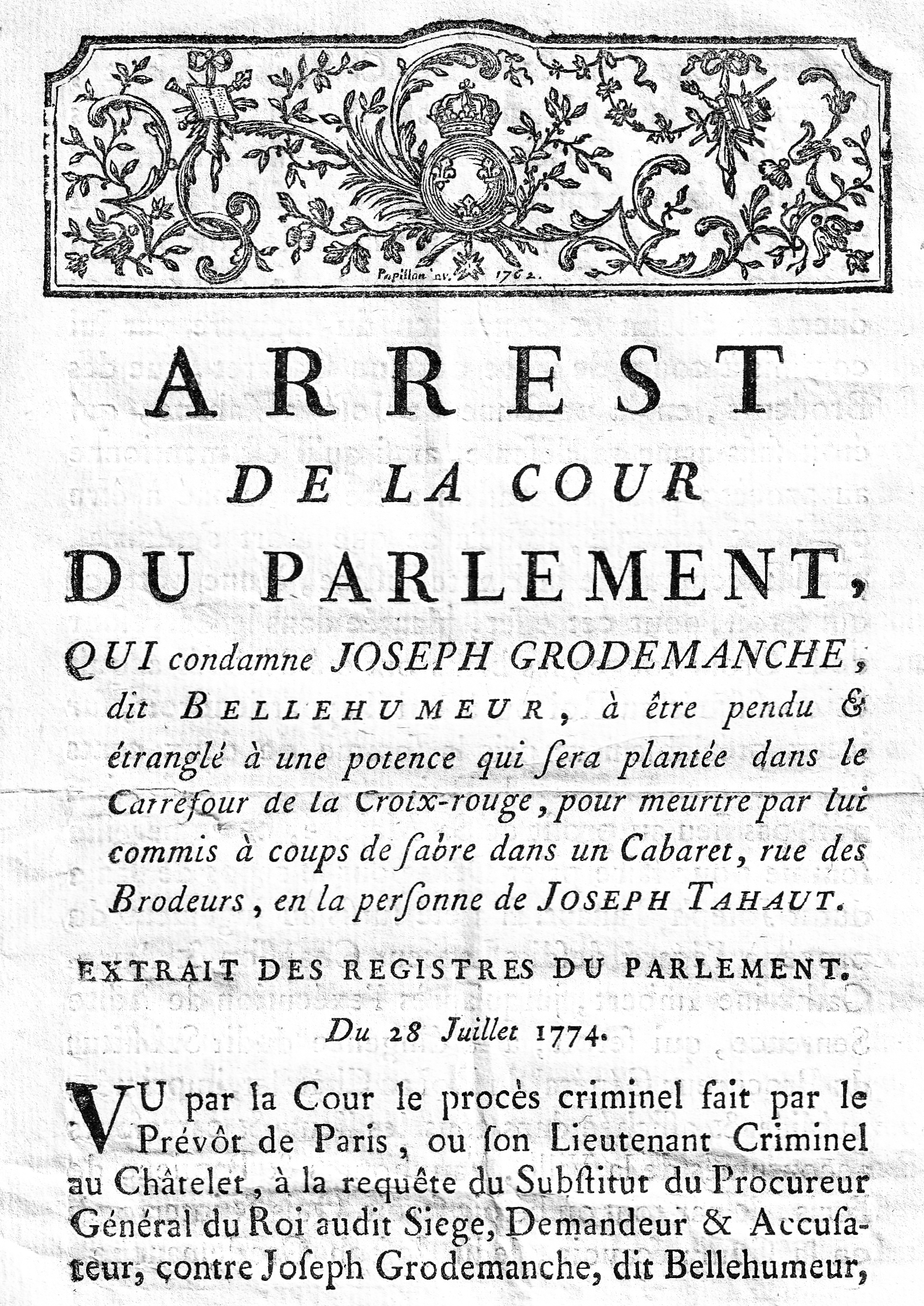
Parlement document dated 28 July 1774, which condemns Joseph Grodemanche called Bellehumeur (1/4)

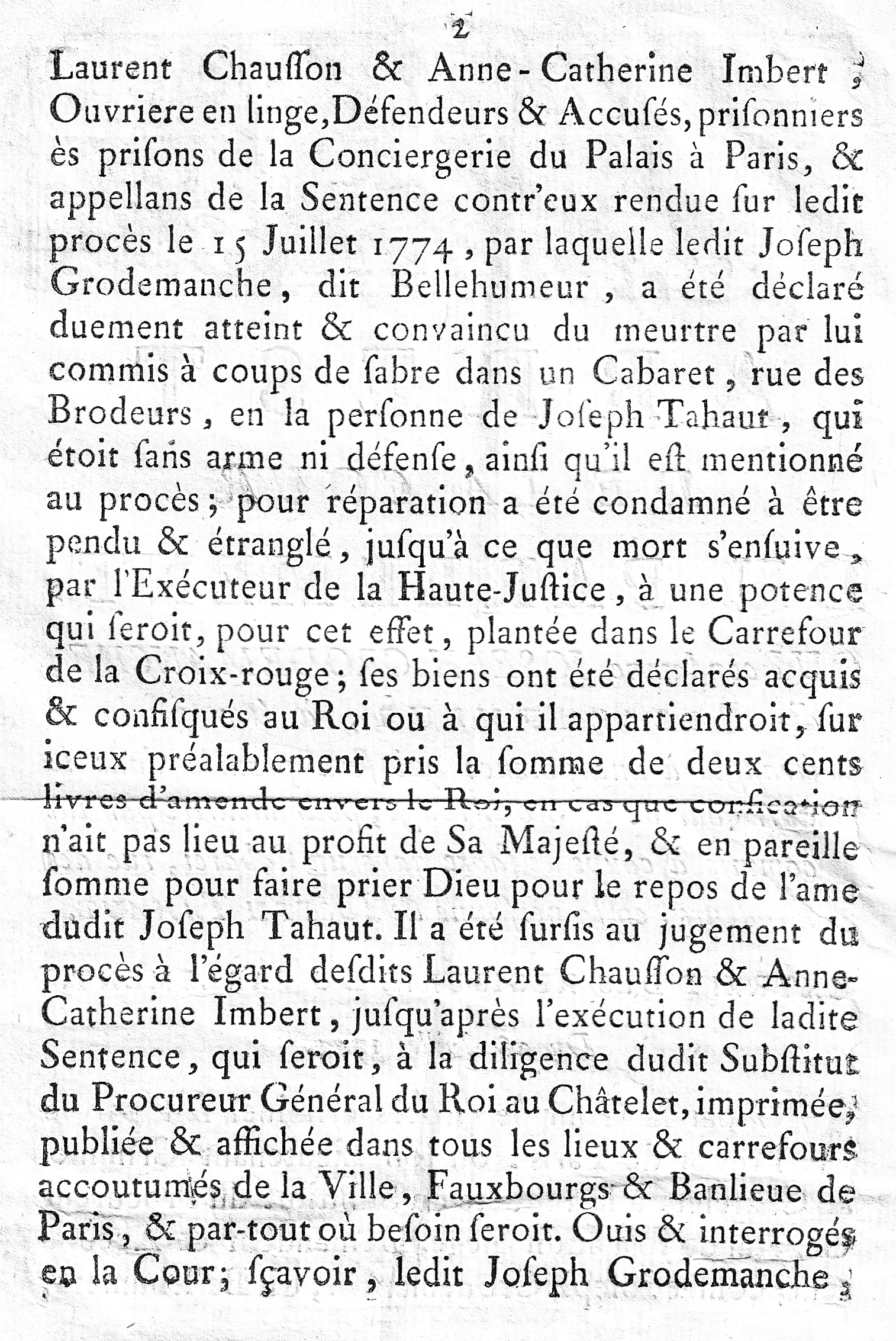
Parlement document dated 28 July 1774, which condemns Joseph Grodemanche called Bellehumeur (2/4)

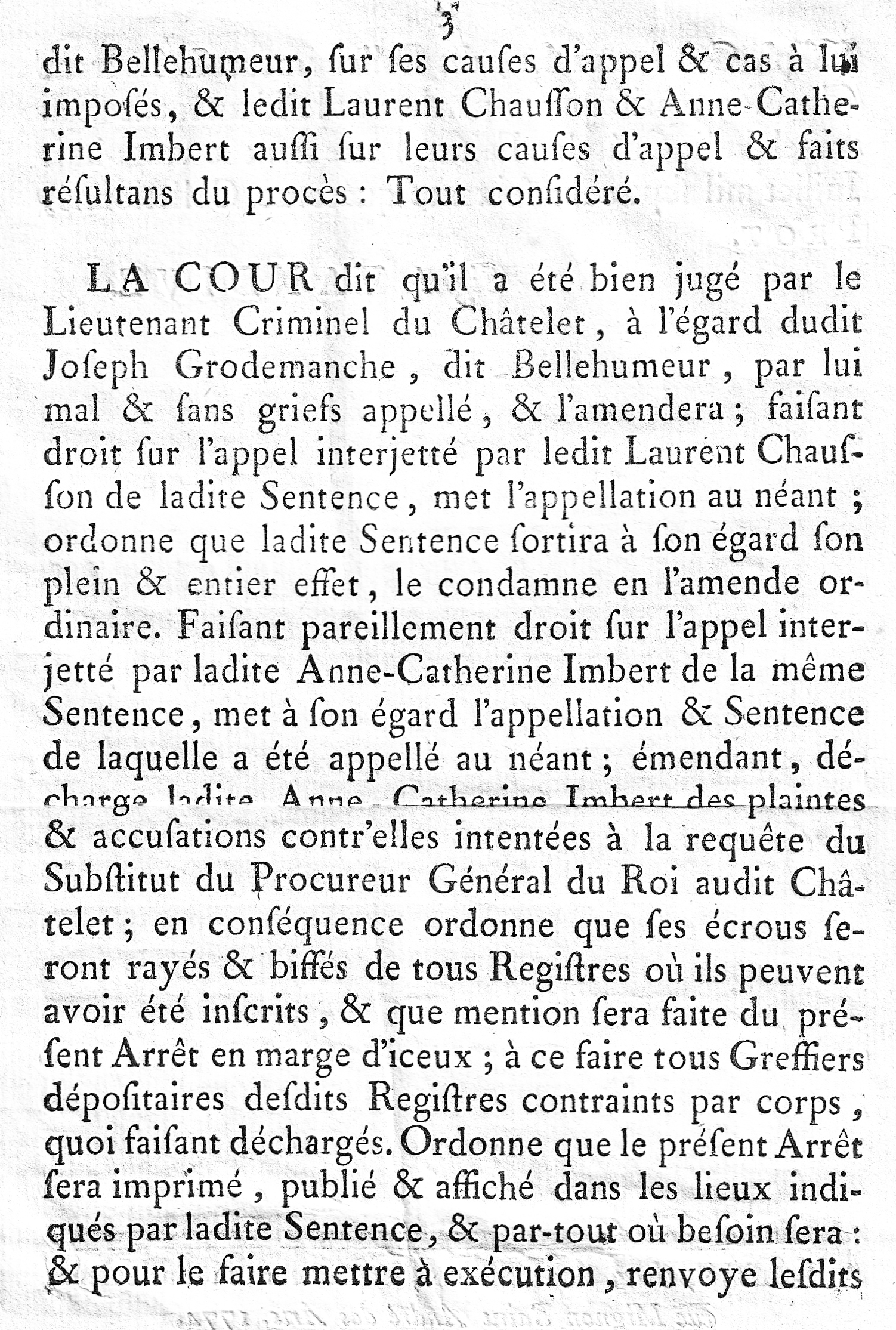
Parlement document dated 28 July 1774, which condemns Joseph Grodemanche called Bellehumeur (3/4)

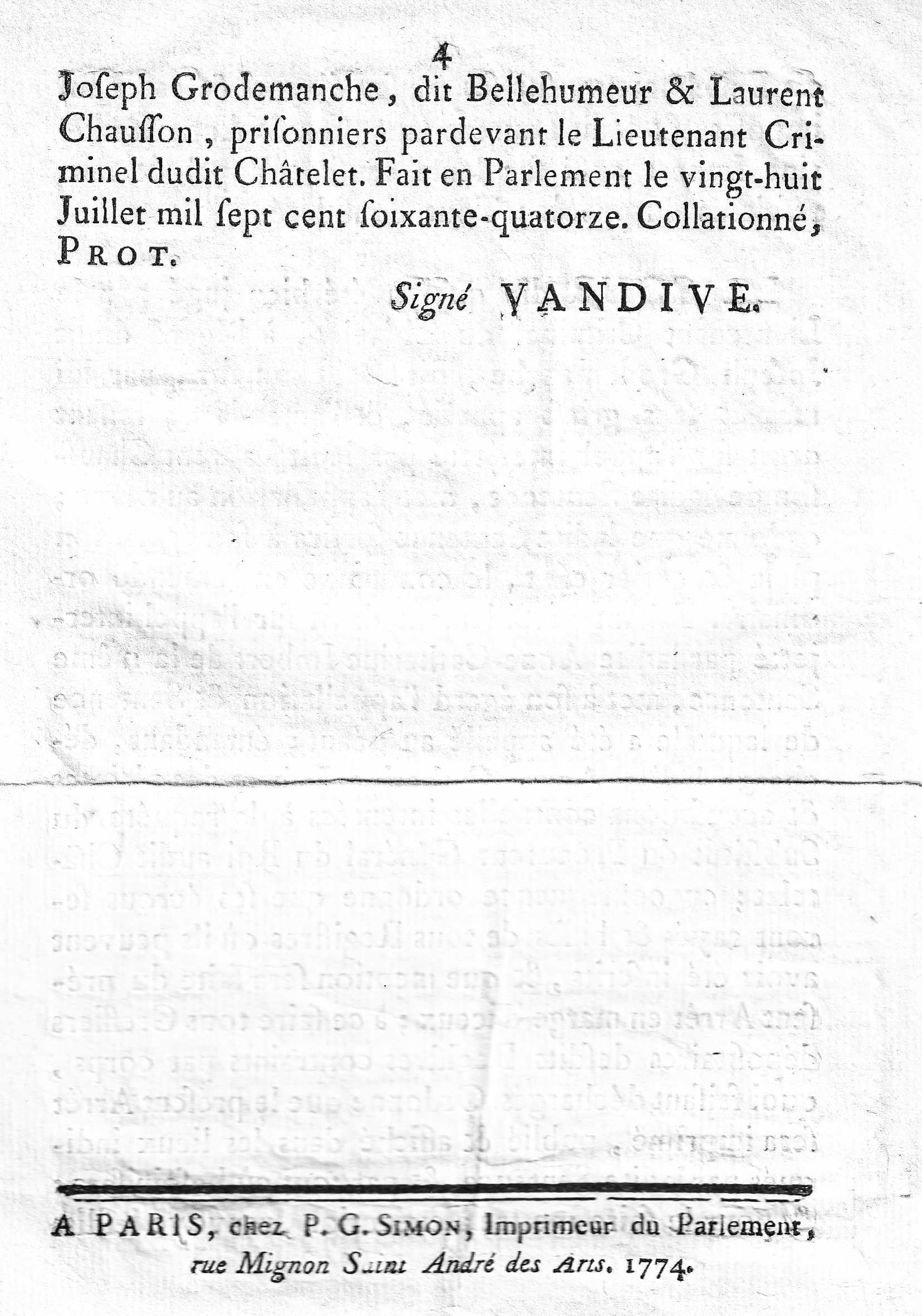
Parlement document dated 28 July 1774, which condemns Joseph Grodemanche called Bellehumeur (4/4)

== See also ==
- Philippe Van Dievoet
- Peter Van Dievoet
- Guillaume Vandive

== Bibliography ==
- L'Etat de la France, 4th volume, Paris, 1749, p. 383.
- Mercure de France, February 1760, p. 219.
- Helvétius, Correspondance générale d'Helvétius, édition critique par Peter Allan et alii, 3rd volume, 1761–1774, p. 479.
- Journal politique de Bouillon, Bouillon, 1771.
- France Sovereign, Lettres patentes du roi, pour la construction des bâtimens devant servir à, 1715–1774.
- MM. Jourdan, Isembert, Decrusy, Recueil général des anciennes lois françaises- depuis l'an 420 jusqu'à la révolution de 1789, Paris, 1824, 23rd Volume, p. 173 and p. 175.
- Félix Lazare and Louis Lazare, Dictionnaire administratif et historique des rues de Paris et de ses monuments, Paris, 1844, p. 660.
- Jean Cruppi, Un avocat journaliste au XVIIIe siècle: Linguet, Paris, published by Hachette, 1895, chapter 8 (1774-1775), Mort de Louis XV, p. 352.
- Alfred Détrez, Aristocrates et joailliers sous l'ancien régime, in La Revue (former Revue des Revues), 78th volume, Paris, 1908, p. 471.
- Siméon-Prosper Hardy, Mes loisirs, Paris, 1912, p. 266.
- Ludovic de Colleville (comte) and François Saint-Christo, Les ordres du roi, Paris, Jouve editions, 1924.
- Robert Villers, L'organisation du parlement de Paris et des conseils supérieurs d'après la réforme de Maupeou, Paris, 1937, p. 109.
- Alain van Dievoet, « Généalogie de la famille van Dievoet originaire de Bruxelles, dite van Dive à Paris », in Le Parchemin, edited by the Genealogical and Heraldic Office of Belgium, Brussels, 1986, n° 245, pp 273–293.
- Alain Van Dievoet, « Van Dive, joaillier du Dauphin », in : L'intermédiaire des chercheurs et curieux : mensuel de questions et réponses sur tous sujets et toutes curiosités, Paris, n° 470, 1990, columns 645–650.
- Béatrice de Andia and Nicolas Courtin, L'île Saint-Louis : Action Artistique de la Ville de Paris, Paris, 1997, p. 112.
- Alain van Dievoet, « Quand le savoir-faire des orfèvres bruxellois brillait à Versailles », in : Cahiers bruxellois, Brussels, 2004, pp. 19–66 (Concernant Nicolas Félix Van Dievoet dit Vandive, voir p. 38).
- Hélène Cavalié née d'Escayrac-Lauture, Pierre Germain dit le Romain (1703-1783). Vie d'un orfèvre et de son entourage, Paris, 2007, thesis of the École des Chartes, 1st volume, pp. 209, 210, 345, 350, 429, 447.
- Nicolas Félix Vandive, correspondance by Nicolas Félix Vandive, Electronic Enlightenment Project.
- Siméon-Prosper Hardy, Mes Loisirs, ou Journal d'événemens tels qu'ils parviennent à ma connoissance, edited by Daniel Roche and Pascal Bastien, Presses de l'université Laval, 12 volumes, 2008 to ..., 2nd volume, p. 252 et 283, Paris : éditions Hermann, 2nd volume, p. 252 and p. 183; 3rd volume, p. 418 and p. 431. (index sub verbo: Vandive, Nicolas Félix, greffier de l'audience au Grand Conseil).
