= Émile van Dievoet =

Flemish politician and lawyer

Baron Émile van Dievoet
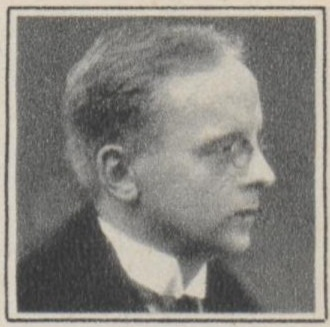

Minister of Justice
- In office 1939–1939
- Prime Minister: Hubert Pierlot
- Preceded by: Joseph Pholien
- Succeeded by: August De Schryver

Personal details
- Born: Josse-Émile van Dievoet; 10 June 1886 Lombeek-Sainte-Catherine, Belgium
- Died: 24 June 1967 (aged 81) Leuven, Belgium
- Party: Catholic Party
- Occupation: Lawyer, politician

Josse-Émile van Dievoet (/ˈdiːvʊt/; 10 June 1886 – 24 June 1967) was a Flemish politician and lawyer. He served as Minister of Justice of Belgium.

He was a Doctor of Law and of political and social sciences. He was also an honorary doctor of Utrecht University and Radboud University Nijmegen.

== Career ==
He was a lawyer at the Leuven Bar and a professor at KU Leuven. He also had a political career campaigning for the use of the Dutch language in Belgium.

He was Minister of Justice and of Agriculture.

He was a member of the Catholic Party.

He was also chairman of ASLK / CGER.

== Political fights ==
He fought mainly for the "dutchification" of the Law in Belgium and against the natural expansion of Brussels. He was against the incorporation of Haren to Brussels.

== Family ==
Émile van Dievoet is the father of:

- Jonkheer Guido van Dievoet, born 12 October 1924, professor at KU Leuven, law historian
- Jonkheer Walter van Dievoet, born 24 June 1931, expert on goldsmithing

Flemish cinematographer Valérie Baeyens, is a great grand daughter of baron van Dievoet.

== Title and arms ==
He was ennobled on 17 March 1967 by King Baudouin with the title of Baron.

He officially obtained hereditary nobility and personal title of Baron on 30 April 1968, after his death.

All his descendants of the same name are titled Jonkheer/Jonkvrouw.

Coat of arms of the family of Émile van Dievoet
| Adopted 1968 Coronet Belgian Baron's coronet (only for the Baron, not his descendants) Crest A cross from the shield Helm argent, crowned Escutcheon Argent, a hand of justice gules, chapé gules, two crosses moline of the field Supporters Two lions or, armed and langued gules Motto Houd voet bij stuk (sticking to one's own ideas; putting one's foot down) Other elements Lambrequins: argent and gules |

== See also ==
- Van Dievoet family, a different family of the same name.
- Dievoet
- Dievoort
- List of Belgian family mottos

== Bibliography ==
- Cahiers d'histoire du temps présent = Bijdragen tot de eigentijdse geschiedenis, du Centre d'études et de documentation "Guerre et sociétés contemporaines" (Belgium, Centre d'études guerres et sociétés contemporaines, Publié par Centre d'études guerres et sociétés contemporaines, 2004, p. 127, 131, 132.
- Encyclopedie van het Vlaamse Beweging, I, Tielt-Utrecht, 1973, 421–422 (avec bibliographie).
- Winkler Prins Encyclopedie van Vlaanderen, II, Bruxelles, 1973, p. 304–305 (concerne le baron Émile et le Jonkheer Guido van Dievoet).
- De Grote Oosthoek, Encyclopedie en Woordenboek, 7^{e} édition, VI, 's-Gravenhage, 1977, 86.
- État présent de la Noblesse du Royaume de Belgique, par Oscar Coomans de Brachène et alii, Bruxelles, 1987, p. 361–362.
- L'État présent de la noblesse belge : annuaire de 2005. Seconde partie, par le Comte Humbert de Marnix de Sainte Aldegonde, et alii.
- Intermédiaire des généalogistes, famille originaire de Ternat, 1977, 232.
- Fernand Baudhuin, L'économie belge sous l'occupation, 1940–1944, p.366.
- Robert Capelle, Au service du roi: 1940–1945, éd. C. Dessart, 1949, p.117, 277, 318.
- F. Collin, "Prof. E. Van Dievoet", dans Onze Alma mater, II, 1948, No. 3.
- Alain Dantoing, La "Collaboration" du cardinal: L'Église de Belgique dans la Guerre 40–45, 1991, page 371.
- Henri Grégoire et Oscar Grojean, dans, Le Flambeau: revue belge des questions politiques et littéraires, vol. 11 pt.3 1928: "Il y a le projet de la commission ou projet Van Dievoet. M. Van Dievoet, suivi par la majorité de la commission, éteint la peine pour tous les condamnés y compris Borms
- Carl-Henrik Höjer, Le régime parlementaire belge de 1918 à 1940, 1946, p. 288. ("M. Spaak avait élargi la base linguistique de son gouvernement en y appelant deux extrémistes: le flamingant van Dievoet, etc.").
- J.Marijnen, "Nieuwe tendenties in het Vlaamsche Rechtsleven", dans, Het vlaamsche Land, 1er juillet 1943.
- Pierre Stéphany, La Flandre aux Flamands, Bruxelles, 2008, 2007.
- Georges van Hecke, Notes pour servir à l'histoire du barreau de cassation, Bruxelles, 1979, p.42.
- Leen van Molle, Chacun pour tous: le Boerenbond Belge, 1890–1990, 1990, p.318
- P. Van Molle, Le Parlement belge 1894–1969, Ledeberg, 1969, 349–350 (avec bibliographie).
- Baronne Els Witte, De Brusselse negentien gemeenten en het Brussels model, Bruxelles, 2003, p. 49: " (Emiel) Van Dievoet vreesde duidelijk dat de Vlaams-katholieke identiteit van de bevolking door de inlijving bij Brussel in de verdrukking zou komen": " Émile Van Dievoet craignait clairement que l'identité catholico-flamande de la population (de Haeren) soit soumise à pression après l'incorporation à Bruxelles"
