= Vandive family =

Vandive family Van Dievoet, Vandivout
- Coat of arms
- Parent family: Van Dievoet family
- Country: Kingdom of France; French First Republic
- Origin: Brussels, Spanish Netherlands
- Founded: 17th century
- Founder: Philippe Van Dievoet
- Final head: François Gilles Vandive
- Titles: Ecuyer
- Traditions: Roman Catholicism
- Dissolution: 1802

The Vandive family (/vɒ̃dɪv/; or Van Dievoet called Vandive; in French: Van Dievoet dit Vandive) was a Parisian branch of the Van Dievoet family from Brussels, descended from goldsmith Philippe Van Dievoet, the elder brother of famous Brussels sculptor Peter Van Dievoet. The family were first bourgeois of Paris before becoming part of the French nobility.

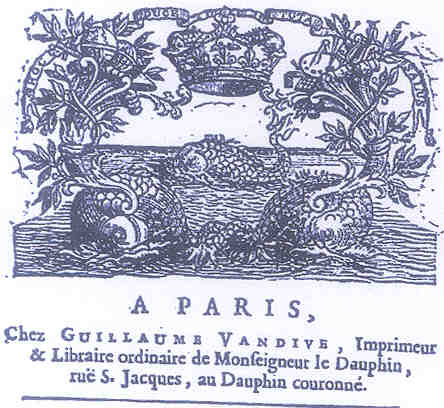
Typographic mark of Guillaume Vandive, book printer of the Grand Dauphin, with his motto : "HOC DUCE TUTA SALUS", 1704.

This Parisian branch of the Van Dievoet family became extinct in 1802 with the death of François Gilles Vandive.

== Name ==
Depending on the source, the name of Philippe Van Dievoet was changed to Vandive either by the Dauphin of whom he had been the jeweller, or by his father, King Louis XIV. Before that, it was briefly written as Vandivout, in an attempt to frenchize the name.

== Members ==
- Philippe van Dievoet called Vandive, écuyer (1654–1738), councillor to the king, goldsmith of King Louis XIV and consul of Paris.
- Guillaume Vandive, (1680–1706), printer of the Dauphin.
- Balthazar Philippe Vandive, goldsmith and consul of Paris
- Nicolas Félix Vandive, écuyer, lawyer at the Parlement of Paris, Clerk of the Hearing at the King's Council, Secretary-Advisor to King House and Crown of France.

== Ennoblements ==
Two of its members benefitted from personal and/or hereditary ennoblements due to their functions and offices.

- 1680 : personal nobility with the title of écuyer for the goldsmith Philippe van Dievoet called Vandive, councillor to the King, due to his position as an officer of the Garde-Robe of the King from 1680 until 1711.
- 1743 : hereditary nobility for Nicolas Félix Vandive, clerk of the Grand Conseil, sworn in on 26 April 1743, which granted him hereditary nobility as of 1763 after a service of 20 years (principle of nobility of 1743)
- 1771 : the same Nicolas Félix van Dievoet called Vandive also held the ennobling office of advisor-notary-secretary of the king.

== Heraldry ==
Coat of arms of the Van Dievoet family
Escutcheon Per pale Argent and Sable, on a tower embattled of four merlons counterchanged and gated of the field between in chief two mullets of six-points Gules and Or and in base a crescent counterchanged, an escutcheon per pale Or and Gules charged with a dexter human foot sole counterchanged.

== See also ==
- Balthazar Martinot
