= Philippe Van Dievoet =

Belgian goldsmith and jeweller (1654–1738)

Philippe Van Dievoet called Vandive Écuyer
- Born: 9 January 1654; Brussels
- Died: 1 February 1738 (aged 84); Paris
- Citizenship: Spanish Netherlands(1654-1685); Kingdom of France(1685-1738)
- Occupations: Goldsmith, jeweller
- Title: Écuyer
- Parent(s): Gilles van Dievoet and Catherine Slachmeulder
- Family: Vandive family

Sire Philippe Van Dievoet (/ˈdiːvʊt/) called Vandive (/vɒ̃dɪv/), écuyer, (1654 – 1738) was a celebrated goldsmith and jeweller. He was goldsmith to King Louis XIV, councillor of the King, officier de la Garde Robe du Roi (officer of the King's wardrobe), trustee of the Hôtel de ville of Paris, and Consul of Paris.

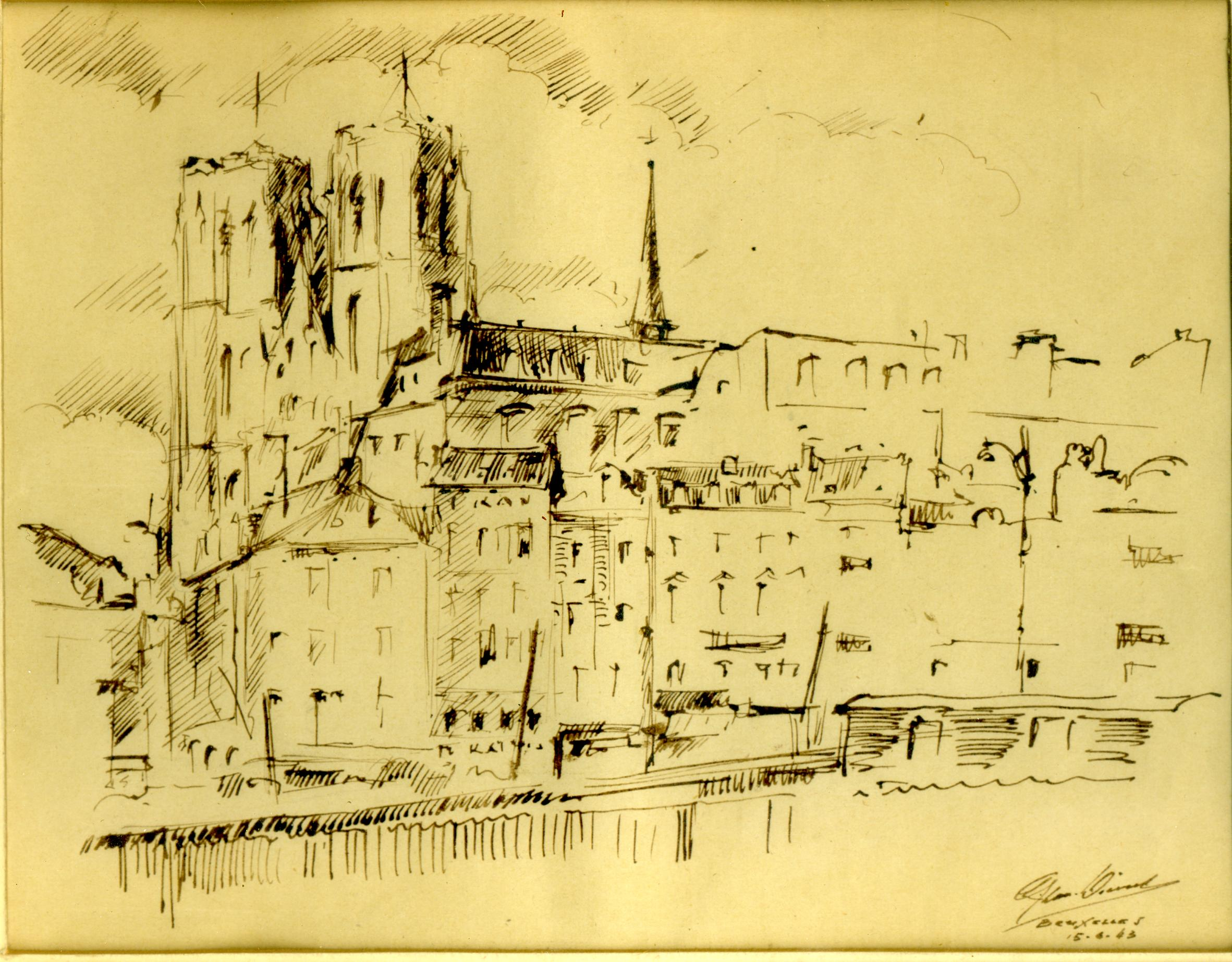
Philippe van Dievoet was baptised in 1654 in the Church of St. Michael and St. Gudula. Drawing by Léon van Dievoet.

== Ennoblement ==
Sire Philippe Van Dievoet called Vandive, as an officier de la Garde Robe du Roi (officer of the King's wardrobe), benefitted from personal Nobility along with the title of Ecuyer during his tenure from 1680 until 1711.

== Name ==
Depending on the source, the name of Philippe Van Dievoet was changed to Vandive either by the Dauphin of whom he had been the jeweller, or by his father, King Louis XIV. Before that, it was briefly written as Vandivout, in an attempt to frenchize the name.

== Family ==
He married, in Paris, Anne Martinot (died 1707), daughter of Balthazar Martinot (1636–1716), clockmaker to Queen Anna of Austria and then to the King.

He was a brother of the sculptor Peter Van Dievoet (1661–1729) and father of the printer Guillaume Vandive.

He formed the Vandive family, the Parisian branch of the Van Dievoet family of Brussels.

== See also ==
- Nicolas Félix Vandive
