= Grand Conseil =

French court of the Ancien Régime

The term Grand Conseil (French pronunciation: [ɡʁɑ̃ kɔ̃sɛj]) or Great Council refers two different institutions during the Ancien Régime in France. It also is the name of parliaments in several Swiss cantons.

== Ancien Régime France ==
=== Part of the King's Council ===
Starting in the 13th century, the "Grand Conseil" was the name given to the largest of the King's Councils, in contrast to the smaller and more elite "Conseil étroit" ("narrow council") or "Conseil secret".

=== Superior Court ===
Under Charles VII, a subcouncil of the King's council appeared to handle particularly contentious affairs. An ordinance by Charles VIII in 1497, and reissued by Louis XII in 1498, removed this section entirely from the King's Council and made it a superior court of justice under the institutional name "Grand Conseil". The "Grand Conseil" was not attended by the king, and it was furnished with its own legal and judicial personnel and with a purview over contentious affairs submitted directly to the king (affairs of "justice retenue", or "justice reserved" for the king). This removal of the Grand Conseil from the council apparatus permitted the remaining sections of the King's council to focus on political and administrative affairs.

The "Grand Conseil" had a jurisdiction over the entire kingdom, but could only be convoked by the king. The king sought the Grand Conseil's intervention in affairs considered to be too contentious for the parlement. The Grand Conseil was convoked on contentious issues pertaining to:

- questions of legal interpretation (the so-called process of "évocation"):
  - "évocation générale": disputes concerning religious benefices after the Concordat of Bologna of 1516 (the parlements tended to ignore or refuse to honor the clauses of the Concordat) or problems with the implementation of the clauses of the papal bull Unigenitus
  - "évocation particulière": on the request of the king or a member of the high nobility.
- as an appellate court concerning conflicts of judicial or administrative jurisdiction (as, say. between the different parlements).
- questions concerning counterfeit royal letters.

At its creation, the "Grand Conseil" was presided by the Chancellor of France, assisted by the maîtres des requêtes, and included several specialized officers (initially 17 counsellors, increased to 20 (dividing their service in two semester) by Louis XII). Under Francis I, the positions of First President and four secondary (or so-called "mortar board" magistrates) "président à mortier" were added, and the chancellor ceased to preside over the court, other than in exceptional circumstances. In this way, the "Grand Conseil" slowly developed an internal structure similar to other sovereign courts of the realm. By the end of the Ancien Régime, the court consisted of a first president, eight presidents, 48 counsellors, a prosecutor ("procureur général"), several attorneys (an ""avocat général" and eight substitutes), and various secretaries, baillifs and scribes.

The "Grand Conseil" was permanently situated in Paris from the reign of Henry II on; its exact location varied over time: first at the Louvre, then at the Augustins, the cloister of Saint-Germain l'Auxerrois, the hôtel d'Aligre (from 1686 on), and again at the Louvre (from 1754 on).

Extremely criticized for its extended jurisdiction, the Grand Conseil nevertheless remained in existence until the French Revolution.

Note: The "Grand Conseil" should not be confused with the "Conseil privé" or "Conseil des parties", which first appeared in 1557. With the "Grand Conseil" being a completely autonomous court of justice separated from the king's council, the need was seen for certain judicial affairs to be discussed and judged within the king's council, especially those in which the impartiality of the courts was called into question. These special session trials gave rise to a new section of the king's council overseeing contentious issues, which took the name "Conseil privé" ("Privy Council") or "Conseil des parties" ("Council of Parties", i.e. the party in a legal suit). The main area of jurisdiction of the "Conseil privé" was civil trials between individuals (especially in cases involving the prestigious families and possible conflicts of interest among parlementary judges) and conflicts of judicial or administrative jurisdiction. The "Conseil privé" was presided by the chancellor, and made up of the maîtres des requêtes and the conseillers d'État. Like the "Grand Conseil", the Privy Council acted as a supreme court, pronounced judgements on the various sovereign courts of the realm (including the parlements and the "Grand Conseil"), and provided final judicial review and interpretation of law, oversight of the judicial corps, and judged disputes on royal offices, church benefices and problems between Catholics and Protestants.

== See also ==
- Ancien Régime in France
- Conseil du Roi
