= Guillaume Vandive =

French printer

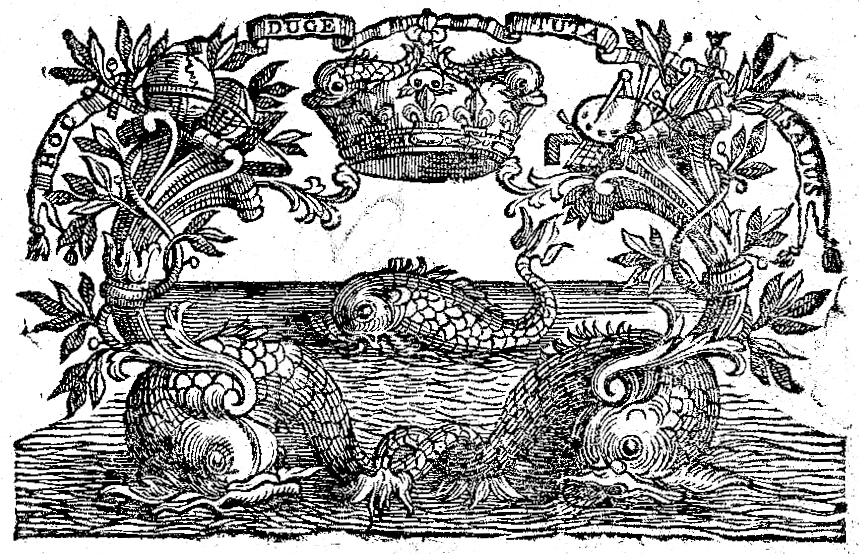
- Born: 22 November 1680; Paris
- Died: 1706 (aged 25–26)
- Occupations: Printer, publisher
- Spouse: Éléonore Le Prieur
- Parent(s): Philippe Van Dievoet and Anne Martinot
- Family: Vandive family

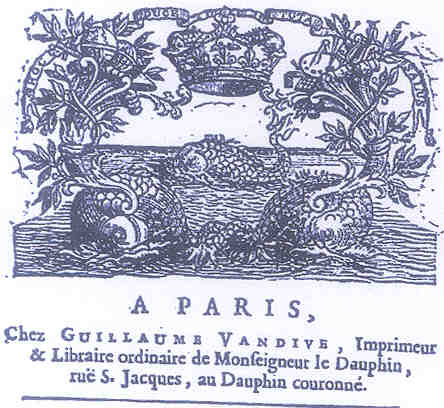
Typographical mark of Guillaume Vandive, 1704

Guillaume Vandive (/vɒ̃dɪv/, also Vandivout and Van Dievoet; /ˈdiːvʊt/) (22 november 1680 – 1706) was a French printer and bookseller. He was a master tradesman under the patronage of the Dauphin of France. Vandive's premises was on the rue Saint-Jacques, Paris. His trade mark was the "Crowned Dolphin". Vandive published books in French and Latin on the topics of Jansenist theology, trade and travel. After his death at age 26, Vandive's business was continued by Nicolas Simart who married Vandive's widow. Family discord and legal actions ensued.

== Personal history ==
Guillaume Vandive was born into the Vandive family on 22 November 1680 in Paris and was baptised on the 24th in the Church of St. Bartholomew, Paris, as "Vandivout" or "Van Dievoet". He was the eldest son of Parisian goldsmith Philippe Van Dievoet (1654 – 1738), originally from Brussels, Counsellor to the King, and Goldsmith to the King and the Dauphin, who traded as "Vandive".

Guillaume Vandive was the nephew of the sculptor Peter Van Dievoet (1661 – 1729) of Brussels.

In 1705, in Paris, Guillaume Vandive married Eléonore Le Prieur. They had a daughter, Charlotte-Eléonore. Guillaume Vandive died in 1706 at age 26. After his death, on 15 June 1706, his widow Eléonore married the printer Nicolas Simart.

== Education ==
From April 1697 to April 1701, Vandive was apprenticed to Jean Boudot (about 1651– 1706), ordinary printer to the King and the Royal Academy of Sciences, and director of the printing works of Louis Auguste, Prince of Dombes of Trévoux. On 20 December 1701, Vandive was accepted as a Master under the recommendation of Monseigneur the Grand Dauphin Louis (addressed as "Monseigneur", as specified by Lottin).

== Production ==
Vandive worked on the rue Saint-Jacques opposite the rue de la Parcheminerie. In 1701, 1704 and 1706, Vandive produced catalogues describing the books he had printed at his business. He also documented other books he had published in France and abroad.

Vandive's typographical mark, made in homage to the Dauphin, consisted of three dolphins swimming surmounted by a fleur-de-lis styled closed crown. There are two cornucopia with a listel at the top. The listel contains the motto, "hoc duce tuta salus" (literally, "under his own safety" but in the spirit of "with this dolphin as guide, your safety is assured") inspired by the legend of the poet, Arion.

== Coignard ==
Vandive published a series of works in collaboration with Louis Coignard (1680 – 27 September 1738). Coignard worked on the rue Saint-Jacques under the "Gold Eagle" mark. On 28 December 1737, Coignard was imprisoned at the Bastille on a charge of publishing Jansenist works. He was transferred to the convent of Meung-sur-Loire where he died a few months later. Coignard was the brother of Elie Jean-Baptiste Coignart (1667 – 1735) who published the first edition of Le Dictionnaire de l'Académie françoise dedié au Roy in 1694. He was the son of Jean-Baptiste Ier Coignart (1637 – 10 September 1686) printer-bookseller of the King and the French Academy.

In 1703, a catalog of the books that Vandive published in collaboration with Coignard was produced. An example of one of the books catalogued is Jean-Pierre Camus' L'Aviosinement des protestants vers l'Eglise romaine. It was a newly corrected edition with an editorial supplement by the Oratorian, Richard Simon (1638 – 1712).

== Published works ==
Vandive published recent and new books in French and sometimes in Latin. The books had various subjects but in particular, were about Jansenist theology, trade and travel.

Vandive's catalogues also contain books intended for "new converts". For example, he published Instructions générales en forme de catéchisme by Charles-Joachim Colbert de Croissy, Bishop of Montpellier. Another example is Histoire abrégée de la Conversion de Monsieur Chanteau by Nicolas Feuillet. Vandive also published the works of Henry de Barillon, Jean-Pierre Camus, Vincent Houdry, and Etienne Lochon. Le Parfait Négociant by Jacques Savary was presented as a new edition, Traité des Lettres de Change.

The special books section of the Royal Library of Brussels, has preserved one of Vandive's publications, Voyage du Sieur Paul Lucas au Levant. It is a work in two volumes dated 1704. It is bound in red morocco leather. The plates bear the arms of Cosimo III de' Medici, Grand Duke of Tuscany.

In 1699, Paul Lucas was sent as the antiquaire du Roi (antique dealer of the King), to the Levant and the East. His task was to collect objects for Louis XIV. According to Dirk Van der Cruysse, his books, published by Vandive, are among the most coloured journals of the period.

== Nicolas Simart ==
Vandive's successor was Nicolas Simart. Simart married Vandive's widow and continued the business at the same address and under the same trade mark as a "printer and ordinary bookseller of Monseigneur the Dauphin".

In 1727, Simart sued Philippe Vandive and Balthazar Philippe Vandive for the expense of the maintenance and education of his step daughter, Charlotte Eléonore. Simart published an account of the indictment of the Vandive family. This indictment is preserved at the National Library of Paris.

In 1731, Simart published a "new re-examined and corrected edition" of the Voyage du Sieur Paul Lucas au Levant. However, it was an exact reproduction of Vandive's first edition.

In 1748, Simart was imprisoned for debts at the Caretaker's Lodge prison of Paris. According to the inspector, Hémery in his "Historique of Booksellers", Simart remained in prison on 1 January 1749.

== Bibliography ==
- Stephanus Axters, La spiritualite des Pays-Bas: l'evolution d'un doctrine mystique, avec une liste des traduction françaises des auteurs nèerlandais, Louvain, 1948, page 168.
- Baron (prosecutor), Mémoire pour Nicolas Simart, marchand libraire à Paris, et damoiselle Eléonore Prieur, son épouse, tuteurs conjointement de damoiselle Charlotte-Eléonore Vandive etc..., Paris, 1727 (Bibliothèque Nationale, coté FOL-FM-18408).
- Hélène Cavalié née d'Escayrac-Lauture, Pierre Germain dit le Romain (1703 - 1783). Vie d'un orfèvre et de son entourage, Paris, 2007, thèse de l'École des Chartes, tome I, pp. 209, 210, 345, 350, 429, 447.
- Etienne Charavay, Revue des documents historiques, Paris, 1880, p. 68
- Paul Delalain, Les libraires et imprimeurs de l'Académie française de 1634 à 1793, Paris, 1907.
- J. B. Denisart, Collection de décisions nouvelles et de notes relatives à la jurisprudence, volume I, Paris, chez la veuve Desaint, 1771, p. 188 and volume 9, Paris, 1790, IV, p. 118 et seq.
- A. Van Dievoet, "Quand le savoir-faire des orfèvres bruxellois brillait à Versailles", in Cahiers bruxellois, volume 37, 1999 – 2003, Brussels, 2004, page 32 to 35.
- Isabella Henriette van Eeghen, Jean Louis de Lorme, De Amsterdamse boekhandel 1680 - 1725, 1961, p. 468.
- A. M. Lottin, l'aîné, Catalogue chronologique des libraires-imprimeurs de Paris, depuis l'an 1470...jusqu'à présent, Paris, 1789, p. 161.
- Maurepas, Mémoires du comte de Maurepas, 1792, p. 327.
- Jean-Dominique Mellot et Élisabeth Queval, Répertoire d'imprimeurs/libraires (vers 1500-vers 1810), Paris, Bibliothèque nationale de France, 2004, p. 92.
- Alfred Détrez, "Aristocrates et joailliers sous l'ancien régime", dans La Revue (ancienne Revue des Revues), volume 78, Paris, 1908, p. 471: "aux grandes fortunes des Delahoquette, des Vandive, des Granchez".

== Collection of books edited by Guillaume Vandive ==
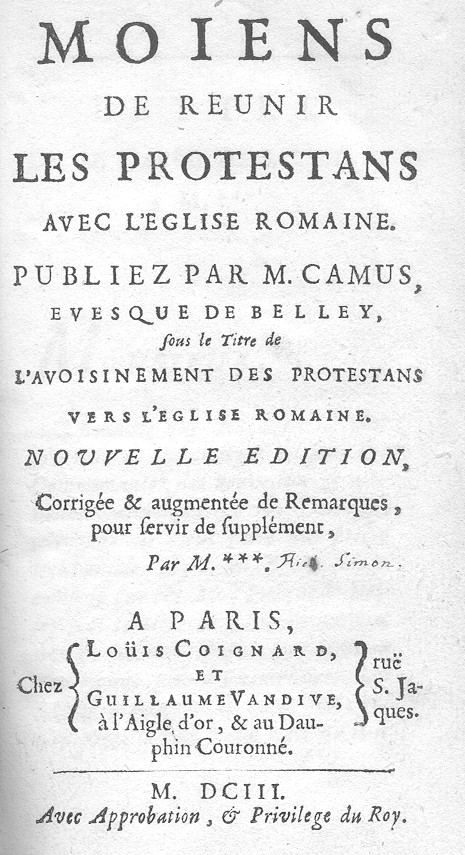
1703 - Frontispiece of the book Moiens de réunir les Protestants avec l'Église romaine, by Camus bishop of Belley and Richard Simon, Paris, 1703, Guillaume Vandive and Louis Coignard.

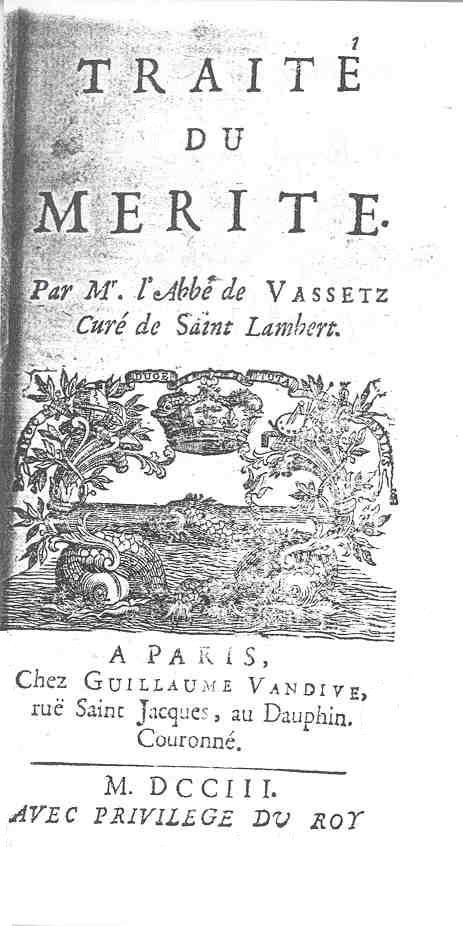
1703 - Frontispiece of the book Traité du Mérite, par l'abbé de Vassetz, printed by Guillaume Vandive, at Paris, au Dauphin Couronné, 1703.

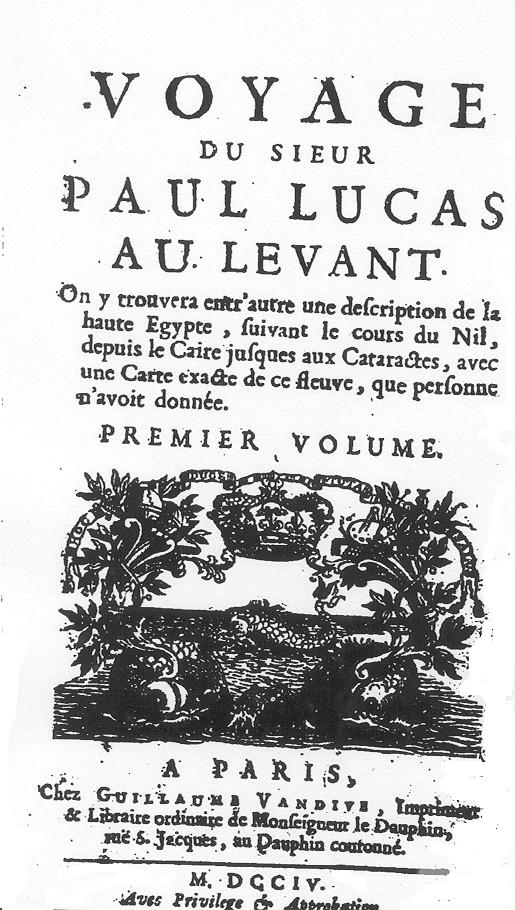
1704 - Page de titre du tome I, de Voyage du Sieur Paul Lucas au Levant, by Guillaume Vandive, Paris, 1704.

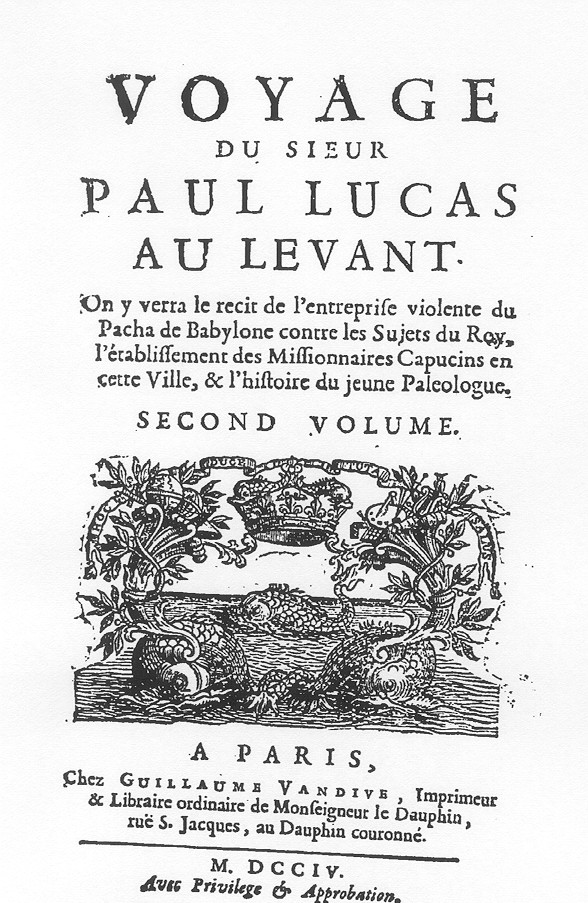
1704 - Frontispice du tome II, de Voyage du Sieur Paul Lucas au Levant, by Guillaume Vandive, Paris, 1704.

== See also ==
- Van Dievoet family
